This is a list of foreign players in the Eredivisie, which commenced play in 1956. The following players must meet both of the following two criteria:
Have played at least one Eredivisie game. Players who were signed by Eredivisie clubs, but only played in lower league, cup and/or European games, or did not play in any competitive games at all, are not included.
Are considered foreign, i.e., outside the Netherlands, determined by the following:
A player is considered foreign if he is not eligible to play for the national teams of the Netherlands.
More specifically,
If a player has been capped on international level, the national team is used; if he has been capped by more than one country, the highest level (or the most recent) team is used. These include Dutch players with dual citizenship.
If a player has not been capped on international level, his country of birth is used, except those who were born abroad from Dutch parents or moved to the Netherlands at a young age, and those who clearly indicated to have switched his nationality to another nation.

Clubs listed are those for which the player has played at least one Eredivisie game—and seasons are those in which the player has played at least one Eredivisie game. Note that seasons, not calendar years, are used. For example, "1992–95" indicates that the player has played in every season from 1992–93 to 1994–95, but not necessarily every calendar year from 1992 to 1995. Therefore, a player should always have a listing under at least two years — for instance, a player making his debut in 2011, during the 2011–12 season, will have '2011–12' after his name. This follows general practice in expressing sporting seasons.

In bold: players who have played at least one Eredivisie game in the (2020–21) season, and the clubs they have played for. They include players who have subsequently left the club, but do not include current players of an Eredivisie club who have not played an Eredivisie game in the current season.

Afghanistan
Shabir Isoufi – Excelsior – 2010–11
Qays Shayesteh – Heracles – 2008–10
Farshad Noor – Roda JC – 2015–16

Albania
Armando Broja – Vitesse – 2020–21
Lindon Selahi – Twente, Willem II – 2019–21
Vasil Shkurti – Roda JC – 2013–14
Agim Zeka – Fortuna Sittard – 2018–20

Algeria
Amir Absalem – Groningen – 2017–20
Paul Amara – DWS – 1960–61
Karim Bridji – FC Volendam, Heracles, RKC Waalwijk – 2003–04, 2006–09, 2011–12
Oussama Darfalou – Vitesse, VVV-Venlo, PEC Zwolle – 2018–22
Rheda Djellal – Excelsior – 2011–12
Youssef Sofiane – Roda JC – 2004–05
Karim Soltani – VVV-Venlo, ADO Den Haag – 2007–10
Ahmed Touba – RKC Waalwijk – 2020–22
Ramiz Zerrouki – Twente – 2020–

Angola
Guilherme Afonso – Twente – 2004–07
Alexander Christovao – Groningen, SC Cambuur – 2012–14
António Correia – Heerenveen – 2002–04
Paolo da Costa Tavares – NAC – 1996–99
Fredy – Excelsior – 2016–17
Luwamo Garcia – VVV-Venlo – 2004–06
Dominique Kivuvu – NEC – 2006–10
Luis Pedro da Silva Ferreira – Groningen – 2011–12

Argentina
Hugo Bargas – De Graafschap – 2008–09, 2010–11
Walter Benítez – PSV – 2022–
Mariano Bombarda – Groningen, Willem II, Feyenoord – 1994–2004
Ezequiel Bullaude – Feyenoord – 2022–
Eduardo Bustos Montoya – Feyenoord – 1996–97
Matías Cahais – Groningen – 2008–10
Julio Cruz – Feyenoord – 1997–2000
Darío Cvitanich – Ajax – 2008–11
Osmar Ferreyra – PSV – 2005–06
Nicolás Freire – PEC Zwolle – 2017–18
Iván Gabrich – Ajax – 1996–97
Patricio Graff – Feyenoord, Den Bosch – 1996–2000
Mariano Juan – Ajax – 1996–2000
Hernán Losada – Heerenveen – 2009–10
Lisandro Magallán – Ajax – 2018–19, 2022–23
Lisandro Martínez – Ajax – 2019–22
Lucas Ocampos – Ajax – 2022–23
Lucas Pratto – Feyenoord – 2020–21
Maximiliano Romero – PSV – 2018–19, 2020–22
Sergio Romero – AZ – 2007–11
Mauro Rosales – Ajax – 2004–07
José San Román – ADO Den Haag – 2016–17
Gerónimo Rulli – Ajax – 2022–
Pablo Sánchez – Feyenoord – 1996–98
Marcos Senesi – Feyenoord – 2019–22
Nicolás Tagliafico – Ajax – 2017–22

Armenia
Gor Agbaljan – Heracles – 2016–17
Norair Aslanyan – Groningen – 2009–11
Edgar Manucharyan – Ajax – 2005–07
Aras Özbiliz – Ajax, Willem II – 2010–12, 2018–19

Aruba
David Abdul – Sparta Rotterdam – 2008–10
Gregor Breinburg – De Graafschap, NEC, Sparta Rotterdam – 2010–12, 2015–19
Erixon Danso – Utrecht, FC Dordrecht – 2008–11, 2014–15
Ronny Nouwen – Excelsior – 2002–03

Australia
Zlatko Arambasic – NAC – 1996–97
Graham Arnold – Roda JC, NAC – 1990–92, 1995–97
Daniel Arzani – Utrecht – 2020–21
Eli Babalj – PEC Zwolle – 2014–15
Josip Bačak – Vitesse – 1996–97
Aziz Behich – PSV – 2018–19
Mark Birighitti – NAC – 2017–19
Milan Blagojevic – Heerenveen – 1993–94
Jason van Blerk – Go Ahead Eagles – 1992–95
Eddy Bosnar – Heracles – 2006–08
Raphael Bove – Heerenveen – 1997–99
David Carney – Twente – 2009–10
Jason Culina – De Graafschap, Ajax, Twente, PSV – 2002–09
Jason Davidson – Heracles, Groningen – 2011–14, 2016–17
Daniel De Silva – Roda JC – 2015–17
Kenneth Dougall – Sparta Rotterdam – 2016–18
Brett Emerton – Feyenoord – 2000–03
Denis Genreau – PEC Zwolle – 2018–19
Craig Goodwin – Sparta Rotterdam – 2016–18
Rostyn Griffiths – Roda JC – 2015–16
Brett Holman – Excelsior, NEC, AZ – 2002–04, 2006–12
Ajdin Hrustic – Groningen – 2016–21
Brad Jones – NEC, Feyenoord – 2015–18
Tomi Juric – Roda JC – 2015–16
Zeljko Kalac – Roda JC – 1998–2002
Stephen Laybutt – RBC Roosendaal – 2000–01
Stefan Mauk – NEC – 2016–17
Ante Milicic – NAC – 1997–99
David Mitchell – Feyenoord, NEC – 1987–89, 1990–91
Tommy Oar – Utrecht – 2010–15
Mike Petersen – Ajax – 1987–88
Nikita Rukavytsya – Twente – 2009–10
Mathew Ryan – AZ – 2022–
Trent Sainsbury – PEC Zwolle, PSV – 2013–15, 2018–19
Adam Sarota – Utrecht – 2010–15
Archie Thompson – PSV – 2005–06
Aurelio Vidmar – Feyenoord – 1995–96
Tony Vidmar – NAC – 1995–97, 2005–06
Luke Wilkshire – Twente, Feyenoord – 2006–08, 2014–15
Peter Zoïs – NAC, Willem II – 2000–01, 2003–07
Michael Zullo – Utrecht – 2010–13

Austria
Gerard Aichorn – Den Bosch – 1983–88
Marko Arnautović – Twente – 2006–09
Richard Brousek – SC Enschede – 1958–60
Martin Fraisl – ADO Den Haag – 2020
Felix Gasselich – Ajax – 1983–85
Fabian Gmeiner – NEC – 2016–17
Adrian Grbić – Vitesse – 2021–22
Florian Grillitsch – Ajax – 2022–
Franz Hasil – Feyenoord – 1969–73
Marc Janko – Twente – 2010–12
Ferdinand Janotka – Holland Sport – 1969–70
Jakob Jantscher – NEC – 2013–14
Volkan Kahraman – Feyenoord – 1997–98
Tobias Kainz – Heerenveen – 2010–11
Roland Kollmann – Twente – 2001–02
Wilhelm Kreuz – Sparta Rotterdam, Feyenoord – 1972–78
Eduard Krieger – VVV-Venlo – 1978–79
Marko Kvasina – Twente – 2017–18
Rolf Landerl – AZ, Fortuna Sittard, Groningen – 1998–2004
Andreas Lasnik – Willem II, NAC – 2010–13
Michael Liendl – Twente – 2017–18
Phillipp Mwene – PSV – 2021–
Franz Oberacher – AZ – 1982–83
Thomas Prager – Heerenveen – 2003–08
Martin Pušić – Sparta Rotterdam – 2016–17
Marcel Ritzmaier – PSV, Cambuur, NEC, Go Ahead Eagles – 2012–18
Heinz Schilcher – Ajax – 1971–73
Michael Schimpelsberger – Twente – 2010–11
Wolfgang Schwarz – Sparta Rotterdam – 1979–80
Gernot Trauner – Feyenoord – 2021–
Andreas van der Veldt – HFC Haarlem – 1982–84
Kurt Welzl – AZ – 1978–81
Maximilian Wöber – Ajax – 2017–19

Barbados
Ryan Trotman – Twente – 2017–18

Belarus
Pavel Mikhalevich – NEC – 1994–2000
Aleh Poetsila – NEC – 1995–98
Andrei Zygmantovich – Groningen – 1991–92

Belgium

A 
 Naïm Aarab – NEC – 2007–08
 Stanley Aborah – Ajax, Vitesse – 2004–05, 2011–12
Shawn Adewoye – RKC Waalwijk – 2020–
 Kristof Aelbrecht – Vitesse – 1999–2000
 Tim Aelbrecht – RKC Waalwijk – 2003–04
 Toby Alderweireld – Ajax – 2008–14
 Jean-Pierre Andries – Helmond Sport – 1983–84
Francesco Antonucci – Volendam – 2022–
Sebbe Augustijns – RKC Waalwijk – 2020–
 Thomas Azevedo – Go Ahead Eagles – 2013–14
 Ismail Azzaoui – Willem II, Heracles Almelo – 2017–18, 2020–22

B 
 Beni Badibanga – Roda JC – 2016–17
 Ziguy Badibanga – De Graafschap – 2011–12
Johan Bakayoko – PSV – 2021–
Zakaria Bakkali – PSV, RKC Waalwijk – 2013–14, 2022
 Pascal Beeken – NAC – 1996–97
 Kevin Begois – Roda JC, VVV-Venlo, PEC Zwolle – 2005–06, 2007–11, 2013–14, 2015–16
 Manuel Benson – PEC Zwolle – 2020–21
 Davy De Beule – Roda JC – 2011–14
 Bart Biemans – Willem II, Roda JC – 2008–16
 Gilles De Bilde – PSV – 1996–99
 Roberto Blanquez – MVV – 1999–2000
Xander Blomme – Go Ahead Eagles – 2022–
 Siebe Blondelle – Vitesse, VVV-Venlo – 2005–08
 Ruud Boffin – VVV-Venlo – 2009–10
 Hakim Borahsasar – Breda – 2014–15
Mohamed Bouchouari – Emmen – 2022–
 Samy Bourard – ADO Den Haag – 2020–22
 Othman Boussaid – Utrecht – 2018–19, 2020–
 Dedryck Boyata – Twente – 2012–13
 Jorn Brondeel – Twente, Willem II – 2017–18, 2019–22
 Loris Brogno – Sparta Rotterdam – 2016–18
 Thomas Buffel – Feyenoord – 1999–2000, 2002–05
 Dario Van den Buijs – Heracles, Fortuna Sittard, RKC Waalwijk – 2017–
 Bart Buysse – Twente, NEC – 2010–12, 2015–16

C 
 Jinty Caenepeel – Excelsior – 2017–19
 Thomas Caers – MVV – 1999–2000
 Tom Caluwé – Willem II, Utrecht – 1999–2009
 Giuseppe Canale – Roda JC – 1995–96
 Fabio Caracciolo – ADO Den Haag – 2008–09
 Bram Castro – Roda JC, Heracles – 2006–10, 2014–18
 Jurgen Cavens – Twente – 2002–03
 Benjamin De Ceulaer – Feyenoord, RKC Waalwijk – 2005–07, 2009–10
 Nacer Chadli – Twente – 2010–13
 Thomas Chatelle – NEC – 2010–11
 Alessandro Ciranni – Fortuna Sittard – 2018–19
 Ian Claes – Heerenveen – 2000–01
 Gert Claessens – Vitesse – 2001–03
 Geoffrey Claeys – Feyenoord – 1996–98
 Marc De Clerck – Twente, Go Ahead Eagles – 1974–76, 1979–80
Antoine Colassin – Heerenveen – 2022–
 Jerôme Colinet – Roda JC – 2003–06
 Pieter Collen – NEC, Feyenoord, NAC – 1999–2007
 Jordy Croux – Willem II – 2016–19

D 
 Björn Daelemans – RBC Roosendaal, Heracles – 2001–08
 Jos Daerden – Roda JC – 1984–86
 David Damman – Heerenveen – 1997–98
 Jelle Van Damme – Ajax – 2002–04
 Lennerd Daneels – RKC Waalwijk – 2019–22
 Dimitri Davidovic – NEC – 1969–71
 Laurens De Bock – ADO Den Haag – 2019–20
 Garry De Graef – RKC Waalwijk, De Graafschap – 1998–2003, 2004–05
 Mathias De Wolf – NEC – 2021–
 Marc Degryse – PSV – 1996–98
 Sven Delanoy – Willem II – 2003–06
 Hannes Delcroix – RKC Waalwijk – 2019–20
 Laurent Delorge – ADO Den Haag, Ajax, Roda JC – 2006–13
 Gregory Delwarte – Roda JC – 1997–2000
 Mousa Dembélé – Willem II, AZ – 2005–10
 Timothy Derijck – Feyenoord, NAC, ADO Den Haag, PSV, Utrecht – 2005–07, 2008–16
Anthony Descotte – Utrecht – 2022–
 Kevin Van Dessel – NAC, Roda JC, VVV – 1997–98, 1999–2006, 2009–10
 Johan Devrindt – PSV – 1970–72
 Sieben Dewaele – Heerenveen – 2020–21
 Alexandre Di Gregorio – RKC Waalwijk – 2009–10
 Seydina Diarra – NEC – 2013–14
Landry Dimata – NEC – 2022–
 Rheda Djellal – Excelsior – 2011
 Célestin Djim – Roda JC – 2016–18
Jacky Donkor – Fortuna Sittard, Excelsior – 2019–20, 2022-
 Bart Van Den Eede – Den Bosch, Breda, Willem II, NEC – 2000–06

E 
 Yassine El Ghanassy – Heerenveen – 2012–13
 Sofiène El Khadri – Fortuna Sittard – 2001–02
 Vincent Euvrard – Den Bosch – 2004–05

F 
 Wout Faes – Heerenveen, Excelsior – 2016–18
 Davy De Fauw – Sparta Rotterdam, Roda JC – 2001–02, 2005–11
 Andréa Fileccia – Excelsior – 2010–12
 Predrag Filipović – Roda JC – 2002–05
 Guy François – PSV, VVV-Venlo, MVV – 1975–78, 1987–88

G
 Jordan Garcia-Calvete – De Graafschap – 2011–12
 Chris Van Geem – Fortuna Sittard – 2001–02
 Eric Gerets – MVV, PSV – 1984–92
 Bart Goor – Feyenoord – 2004–05
 Christophe Grégoire – Willem II – 2008–10
 Daniel Guijo-Velasco – PSV, Excelsior – 2003–04, 2006–08

H
 Stijn Haeldermans – MVV – 1995–96, Fortuna Sittard – 2000–02
 Robbie Haemhouts – NAC, Den Bosch, Willem II – 2001–05, 2012–13, 2014–16
 Geoffry Hairemans – De Graafschap – 2010–11
Thorgan Hazard – PSV – 2022–
 Jimmy Hempte – Roda JC – 2010–13
 Stephan Van Der Heyden – Roda JC – 1996–99
 Michaël Heylen – Emmen, Sparta Rotterdam – 2019–
 Davy Heymans – MVV – 1999–2000
 Jonas Heymans – Willem II – 2014–15
 Siebe Horemans – Excelsior – 2018–19
 Kenny Van Hoevelen – RKC Waalwijk – 2013–14
 Peter Van Houdt – Roda JC – 1996–2000
 Stein Huysegems – AZ, Feyenoord, Twente, Roda JC – 2003–09, 2010–11
 Tom Van Hyfte – Roda JC – 2015–17

I
 Kristof Imschoot – Willem II – 2006–07
 Jonas Ivens – Groningen, RKC Waalwijk – 2010–14

J
 Jochen Janssen – RKC Waalwijk, Den Bosch – 2001–06
 Chris Janssens – Willem II – 2001–03

K
Elton Kabangu – Willem II – 2019–20, 2021–
Nathan Kabasele – De Graafschap – 2015–16
Hüseyin Karapinar – MVV – 1998–2000
Andy Kawaya – Willem II – 2015–16
Onur Kaya – Vitesse – 2005–10
Jonas Van Kerckhoven – Willem II – 2012–13
Wim Kiekens – Fortuna Sittard – 1998–2001
Christophe Kinet – Sparta Rotterdam – 2004–06
Sven Kums – Heerenveen – 2011–14

L
 Leroy Labylle – PEC Zwolle – 2013–14
 Vincent Lachambre – Roda JC – 2001–11
 Nayib Lagouireh – Excelsior – 2010–12
 Roland Lamah – Roda JC – 2007–08
 Sidney Lammens – RBC Roosendaal – 2003–06
 Ken Leemans – Roda JC, VVV-Venlo – 2006–11
 Erwin Lemmens – RKC Waalwijk – 2006–07
 Yves Lenaerts – PSV – 2002–03
 Philippe Léonard – Feyenoord – 2006–07
 Christophe Lepoint – Willem II – 2003–04
 Maxime Lestienne – PSV – 2015–16
 Gérard Lifondja – RKC Waalwijk – 2009–10
 Anthony Limbombe – NEC – 2015–16
 Sébastien Locigno – Go Ahead Eagles – 2016–17
Thierry Lutonda – RKC Waalwijk – 2020–

M
 Birger Maertens – Heracles – 2008–11
 Kris Mampaey – Willem II, Den Bosch – 1996–2000, 2001–05
 Mark De Man – Roda JC – 2008–09
 Jan-Pieter Martens – Roda JC – 1996–97
 Maarten Martens – RKC Waalwijk, AZ – 2004–14
 Christophe Martin – Willem II – 2001–03
 Stefano Marzo – Heerenveen – 2013–17
 Hervé Matthys – Excelsior – 2018–19
 Rik Matthys – Willem II – 1957–59
 Emmanuel Matuta – Groningen – 2021–
 Donovan Maury – Roda JC – 2002–03
 Tim De Meersman – Vitesse – 2004–06
 Stijn Meert – MVV – 1999–2000
 Walter Meeuws – Ajax – 1984–85
 Dries Mertens – Utrecht, PSV – 2009–13
 Mohamed Messoudi – Willem II – 2006–09
 David Meul – Willem II – 2012–13, 2014–15
 Alain Van Mieghem – Roda JC – 2002–04
 Livio Milts – Roda JC – 2017–18
 Marc Minnaert – Breda – 1996–97
 Tom Van Mol – PSV, Sparta Rotterdam, PSV, Utrecht – 1991–2004
 Martijn Monteyne – Roda JC – 2011–16
 Tom De Mul – Ajax, Vitesse – 2003–07
 Charly Musonda – Vitesse – 2018–20
 Tom Muyters – Excelsior – 2015–17

N
Mike Trésor Ndayishimiye – Willem II – 2019–22
Maecky Ngombo – Roda JC – 2015–16, 2017–18
Cyril Ngonge – RKC Waalwijk, Groningen – 2020–
Kevin Nicolay – De Graafschap – 2002–03
Luc Nilis – PSV – 1994–2000
Chiró N'Toko – ADO Den Haag – 2010–12
Rob Nuyts – MVV – 1999–2001

O
 Willem Ofori-Appiah – Roda JC – 2015–16
 Funso Ojo – PSV, VVV-Venlo, Dordrecht, Willem II – 2008–12, 2014–17
 Loïs Openda – Vitesse – 2020–22
 Marco Ospitalieri – Fortuna Sittard – 2018–19
 Obbi Oulare – Willem II – 2016–17
 Davy Oyen – PSV – 1998–99

P
 Kurt Van De Paar – Twente – 1998–2003
 Marvin Peersman – Dordrecht, SC Cambuur – 2014–16
 Tristan Peersman – Willem II – 2005–07
 Bob Peeters – Roda JC, Vitesse – 1997–2003
 Frédéric Peiremans – Twente – 1999–2000
 André Piters – Fortuna '54 – 1963–67
 Leon Plucieniczak – MVV – 1962–64
 Sébastien Pocognoli – AZ – 2007–10
 Jens Podevijn – Willem II – 2012–13

R
 Jordan Remacle – RKC Waalwijk – 2006–07
 Michel Ribeiro – Den Bosch – 1999–2000
 Steve De Ridder – De Graafschap, Utrecht – 2008–11, 2013–14
 Dante Rigo – PSV Eindhoven, Sparta Rotterdam, ADO Den Haag – 2017–21
 Philippe Rommens – Go Ahead Eagles – 2021–
 Patrick Rondags – MVV – 1999–2000
 Bart De Roover – NAC Breda – 1997–98
 Sepp De Roover – Sparta Rotterdam, Groningen, NAC – 2006–10, 2012–14
 Giuseppe Rossini – Utrecht – 2005–08

S
 Ryan Sanusi – Willem II, Sparta Rotterdam – 2012–13, 2016–18
 Mathias Schamp – Heracles Almelo – 2012–13
 Guido Schoefs – MVV – 1968
 Davy Schollen – Breda – 2004–06
 Lucas Schoofs – Breda, Heracles Almelo – 2017–18, 2019–22
 Maarten Schops – Roda JC, RKC Waalwijk, RBC Roosendaal, FC Zwolle – 1996–2003
Markus Schubert – Vitesse – 2021–
 Björn Sengier – Willem II – 2006–08
 Dylan Seys – Twente, RKC Waalwijk – 2016–17, 2019–20
 Sekou Sidibe – Emmen – 2020–21
 Elias Sierra – Heracles – 2020–22
 Timmy Simons – PSV – 2005–10
 Tim Smolders – RBC Roosendaal – 2004–06
 Tom Soetaers – Roda JC, Ajax – 1999–2004
 Hans Somers – Utrecht – 2004–10
 Wesley Sonck – Ajax – 2003–05
 Sébastien Stassin – RBC Roosendaal – 2000–01
 Kenny Steppe – Heerenveen – 2008–09, 2010–12
 Gill Swerts – Excelsior, Feyenoord, ADO Den Haag, Vitesse, AZ, NAC – 2002–12, 2013–14

T
 Stefaan Tanghe – Utrecht, Heracles Almelo – 2000–07
 Karim Tarfi – De Graafschap – 2015–16
 Karel Theuwis – PSV, USV Elinkwijk – 1956–61
Mickaël Tirpan – Fortuna Sittard – 2021–
 Dieter Van Tornhout – Sparta Rotterdam, Roda JC – 2005–10
 David Triantafillidis – RKC Waalwijk – 2005–06
 Katuku Tshimanga – Willem II – 2016–17

U
 Adnan Ugur – Fortuna Sittard – 2019–20

V
 Joos Valgaeren – Roda JC – 1997–2000
 Günther Vanaudenaerde – NEC – 2006–07
 Jorn Vancamp – Roda JC – 2017–18
 Jamaïque Vandamme – Roda JC – 2006–10
 Kevin Vandenbergh – Utrecht – 2007–10
 Sven Vandenbroeck – Roda JC, De Graafschap – 2000–05
 Brian Vandenbussche – Sparta Rotterdam, Heerenveen  – 2001–02, 2004–14
 Birger Van De Ven – RBC Roosendaal – 2004–05
Zinho Vanheusden - AZ Alkmaar - 2022-
 Jannes Vansteenkiste – Roda JC – 2017–18
 Guy Veldeman – Willem II – 1999–2003
 Bryan Verboom – Roda JC – 2016–17
 Davino Verhulst – Willem II – 2010–11
 Jan Verlinden – Twente – 1999–2003
 Thibaud Verlinden – Fortuna Sittard – 2021
 Thomas Vermaelen – Ajax, RKC Waalwijk – 2003–09
 Marnick Vermijl – NEC – 2013–14
 Matthias Verreth – PSV – 2018–19
 Yorbe Vertessen – PSV – 2020–
 Jan Vertonghen – Ajax, RKC Waalwijk – 2006–11
 Patrick Vervoort – RKC Waalwijk – 1995–96
 Arno Verschueren – Breda, Sparta Rotterdam – 2017–19, 2022-
 Björn Vleminckx – NEC – 2009–11
 Jordy Vleugels – Willem II – 2014–15
 Geert De Vlieger – Willem II – 1999–2004
 Siemen Voet – PEC Zwolle – 2021–22
 Mark Volders – RBC Roosendaal – 2005–06
 Stijn Vreven – Utrecht, Vitesse, ADO Den Haag – 1999–2003, 2004–07

W
 Jonathan Wilmet – Willem II – 2005–08
 Yves De Winter – De Graafschap – 2011–12
 Chris De Witte – Twente, Groningen – 1997–2005
 Kris De Wree – Roda JC – 2008–10
 Dries Wuytens – Willem II, Heracles Almelo – 2014–18
 Jan Wuytens – Heracles Almelo, Utrecht, AZ – 2005–16
 Stijn Wuytens – PSV, De Graafschap, Willem II, AZ – 2008–12, 2014–20
 Jeanvion Yulu-Matondo – Roda JC – 2007–11

Bermuda
Clyde Best – Feyenoord – 1977–78

Bosnia and Herzegovina
Dario Đumić – NEC, Utrecht, Twente – 2015–18, 2020–22
Ognjen Gnjatić – Roda JC – 2016–18
Nebojša Gudelj – Breda, Sparta Rotterdam – 1997–2006
Amar Ćatić – ADO Den Haag – 2020–22
Boban Lazić – PEC Zwolle – 2015–16
Marko Maletić – Excelsior – 2014–15
Haris Medunjanin – AZ, Sparta Rotterdam – 2004–08
Samir Memišević – Groningen – 2016–20
Boris Rasević – PEC Zwolle – 2013–16
Esad Razić – Den Bosch, RBC Roosendaal – 2001–04
Adnan Sečerović – Roda JC – 2009–10
Miroslav Stefanović – FC Volendam – 1993–96
Tino-Sven Sušić – VVV-Venlo – 2018–19

Brazil
Alcides – PSV – 2007–08
Alex – PSV – 2004–07
Afonso Alves – Heerenveen – 2006–08
Bruno Andrade – Willem II – 2013–16
Arghus – Excelsior – 2016–17
André Bahia – Feyenoord – 2004–11
Antony – Ajax – 2020–23
Michel Bastos – Feyenoord, Excelsior – 2001–03
Pedro Beda – Heerenveen – 2008–09
Eric Botteghin – NAC, Groningen, Feyenoord – 2011–21
Canigia – AZ – 1998–2000, 2002–04
Carlos – Telstar – 1965–66
Carlos Vinícius – PSV Eindhoven - 2021-22
Cássio – PSV, Sparta Rotterdam – 2008–09, 2010–11
Claudemir – Vitesse – 2007–10
Cláudio – PSV, Fortuna Sittard – 1996–98, 2000–02
Cristiano – Breda, Roda JC, Willem II – 1998–2008
Alair Cruz Vicente – AZ – 2000–02, 2003–04
Danilo – Ajax, Twente, Feyenoord – 2019–
Darley – Feyenoord – 2009–10
Émerson – MVV – 1998–99
Everton – Heracles – 2006–13
Fagner – PSV – 2007–08
Zezé Gambassi – Fortuna '54 – 1965–66
Gláucio – Feyenoord – 1994–95, 1997–98
Heurelho Gomes – PSV – 2004–08
Rodrigo Guth – NEC, Fortuna Sittard – 2021–
Gustavo Hebling – PEC Zwolle – 2015–17
Hugo – Groningen – 1997–2005
Jean Carlos – Feyenoord – 2003–04
Jonathas – AZ – 2009–11
Jorginho – PSV – 1998–99
Mauro Júnior – PSV, Heracles – 2017–
Leandro – PSV – 2002–05
Leonardo – Groningen, Feyenoord, De Graafschap, ADO Den Haag – 1997–2004
Leonardo – Feyenoord, NAC, Ajax – 2000–11
Luciano – Groningen – 2008–13
Luis Felipe – PSV – 2020
Magno – Groningen, De Graafschap – 1996–99, 2004–05
Gérson Magrão – Feyenoord – 2004–05
Marcelo – PSV – 2010–13
Marcelo – PSV – 1997–98
Marcos – PSV – 1998–99
Marilia – Sparta Rotterdam – 1996–2002
Marquinho – PSV – 2000–02
Maxwell – Ajax – 2001–06
Nathan – Vitesse – 2015–17
David Neres – Ajax – 2016–22
Sérgio Oliveira – NAC, Roda JC – 2000–06
Igor Paixão – Feyenoord – 2022–
Paulo Henrique – Heerenveen – 2007–10
Lucas Piazon – Vitesse – 2013–14
Rafael – Heerenveen – 2000–02
André Ramalho – PSV – 2021–
Jonathan Reis – PSV, Vitesse – 2008–14
Robert – PSV – 2004–06
Romário – PSV – 1988–93
Ronaldo – PSV – 1994–96
Márcio Santos – Ajax – 1995–97
Sávio – PSV – 2022–
Somália – Feyenoord – 1999–2000
Diego Tardelli – PSV – 2006–07
Tininho – Feyenoord, RBC Roosendaal, NEC, ADO Den Haag – 1998–2001, 2002–07
Bruno Uvini – Twente – 2015–16
Vampeta – PSV – 1994–98
Léo Veloso – Willem II – 2008–10
Wallace – Vitesse – 2014–15
Wamberto – Ajax – 1998–2004
Wellington – Twente – 2009–10
Wilson – Telstar – 1965–66
Renan Zanelli – Willem II – 2014–15
Zefilho – Breda – 1998–99

Bulgaria
Filip Krastev – Cambuur – 2021–22
Stanislav Manolev – PSV – 2009–13
Nikolay Mihaylov – Twente – 2008–09, 2010–13
Simeon Raykov – Roda JC – 2016–17
Stanislav Shopov – Heerenveen – 2021
Igor Tomašić – Roda JC, MVV – 1997–2002
Ivan Tsvetkov – Heerenveen – 1998–2000, 2002–04, 2005–07
Stefan Velkov – RKC Waalwijk – 2019–20
Andrey Zhelyazkov – Feyenoord – 1981–84

Burkina Faso
Rahim Ouédraogo – Twente, Heracles – 1998–2008
Ousmane Sanou – Willem II, Sparta Rotterdam – 1996–2003
Bertrand Traoré – Vitesse, Ajax – 2013–17
Lassina Traoré – Ajax – 2018–21
Mamadou Zongo – Vitesse, De Graafschap – 1997–2006

Burundi
Mohamed Amissi – Heracles – 2020–22
Saidi Ntibazonkiza – NEC – 2006–10
Kassim Bizimana – Groningen – 2005–06

Cameroon
Timothée Atouba – Ajax – 2009–10
Cedric Badjeck – Utrecht, Excelsior – 2011–16
Franck-Yves Bambock – Sparta Rotterdam – 2017–18
Arnaud Djoum – Roda JC – 2008–14
Eyong Enoh – Ajax – 2008–13
Émile Mbamba – Vitesse – 2000–04
Tsiy-William Ndenge – Roda JC – 2017–18
André Onana – Ajax – 2016–22
Willie Overtoom – Heracles, AZ – 2008–14
Kallé Soné – Vitesse – 2002–04
Bernard Tchoutang – Roda JC – 1998–2002

Canada
Charles-Andreas Brym – Sparta Rotterdam – 2022–
Rob Friend – Heerenveen, Heracles – 2006–07
Atiba Hutchinson – PSV – 2010–13
Will Johnson  – Heerenveen, De Graafschap – 2006–08
Marcel de Jong – Roda JC – 2006–10
Andrew Ornoch – Heracles – 2009–10
Randy Samuel – PSV, FC Volendam, Fortuna Sittard – 1986–93
Frank Sturing – NEC – 2016–17
Josh Wagenaar – ADO Den Haag – 2006–07

Cape Verde
Jerson Cabral – Feyenoord, Twente, ADO Den Haag, Willem II, Sparta Rotterdam – 2010–17
Alessio Da Cruz – Twente – 2015–16
Deroy Duarte - Sparta Rotterdam, Fortuna Sittard - 2017-18, 2019-
Jeffry Fortes – FC Dordrecht, Excelsior, Sparta Rotterdam – 2014–15, 2016–19, 2020–21
Josimar Lima – Willem II, FC Dordrecht, VVV-Venlo – 2009–11, 2014–15, 2018–19
Cecilio Lopes – Excelsior, Sparta Rotterdam, FC Volendam – 2002–03, 2006–07, 2008–09
Billy Maximiano – Groningen, Den Bosch – 2000–02
Jamiro Monteiro – SC Cambuur, Heracles – 2015–16, 2017–18
Rui Monteiro – Sparta Rotterdam – 2000–02
Guy Ramos – RKC Waalwijk, Roda JC – 2011–14
Jerson Ribeiro – Excelsior – 2010–11
Zé Rodrigues – Sparta Rotterdam – 1991–93
Lisandro Semedo – Fortuna Sittard – 2018–19, 2020–22
Toni Varela – RKC Waalwijk, Excelsior – 2009–10, 2014–15

Chile
Jorge Acuña – Feyenoord, RBC Roosendaal – 2002–04, 2005–06
Mauricio Aros – Feyenoord – 2001–02
Cristián Cuevas – Twente – 2017–18
Felipe Gutiérrez – Twente – 2012–15
Juan Gonzalo Lorca – Vitesse – 2007–08
Stefano Magnasco – Groningen – 2012–14
Sebastián Pardo – Feyenoord, Excelsior – 2002–08

China
Sun Xiang – PSV – 2006–07
Yu Hai – Vitesse – 2006–08
Zhang Yuning – Vitesse, ADO Den Haag – 2015–17, 2018–19

Colombia
Santiago Arias – PSV – 2013–18
Mateo Cassierra – Ajax, Groningen – 2016–19
Daniel Cruz – Ajax – 2000–01
Luis Manuel Orejuela – Ajax – 2017–19
Davinson Sánchez – Ajax – 2016–17
Luis Sinisterra – Feyenoord – 2018–22

Comoros
Saïd Bakari – RKC Waalwijk – 2019–
Yacine Bourhane – Go Ahead Eagles – 2021–22

Costa Rica
Esteban Alvarado – AZ – 2010–15
Bryan Ruiz – Twente, PSV – 2009–12, 2013–14
Manfred Ugalde – Twente – 2021

Croatia
Andrija Balić – Fortuna Sittard – 2018–19
Kristijan Bistrović – Fortuna Sittard – 2022–
Darko Bodul – Ajax, Sparta Rotterdam – 2008–10
Frane Bućan – MVV – 1991–92
Darko Butorović – Vitesse – 1998–99
Ante Ćorić – VVV-Venlo – 2020–21
Joey Didulica – Ajax, AZ – 2001–03, 2006–07, 2008–11
Tomislav Gomelt – ADO Den Haag – 2020
Alen Halilović – Heerenveen – 2019–20
Tibor Halilović – Heerenveen – 2021–
Marko Kolar – Emmen – 2019–21
Srđan Lakić – Heracles – 2007–08
Mateo Leš – Heracles – 2020–22
Andrej Lukić – Emmen – 2018–19
Ante Miše – Vitesse – 1994–97
Robert Murić – Ajax – 2015–16
Alois Oroz – Vitesse – 2020–22
Ivor Pandur – Fortuna Sittard – 2022–
Stipe Perica – NAC – 2013–15
Danijel Pranjić – Heerenveen – 2005–09
Stipe Radić – Fortuna Sittard – 2022–
Leon Sopić – Emmen – 2019–20
Marin Šverko – Groningen – 2021–
Gabriel Vidović – Vitesse – 2022–
Dario Vujičević – Twente, VVV-Venlo, Heracles – 2008–11, 2012–17

Curaçao
Kemy Agustien – Willem II, Roda JC, AZ, RKC Waalwijk – 2004–08, 2009–10
Vurnon Anita – Ajax, Willem II, RKC Waalwijk – 2005–07, 2008–13, 2018–19, 2020–
Jarchinio Antonia – ADO Den Haag, Go Ahead Eagles, Groningen – 2010–11, 2013–17
Suently Alberto – PSV – 2014–15
Jeremy Antonisse – PSV – 2020–
Shutlan Axwijk – Groningen – 2003–04
Leandro Bacuna – Groningen – 2009–13
Charlison Benschop - Fortuna Sittard - 2021-22
Christy Bonevacia – AZ – 2003–04
Lentini Caciano – Emmen – 2020–
Jurich Carolina – Breda – 2018–19
Kenneth Cicilia – Sparta Rotterdam – 2001–02
Rigino Cicilia – Roda JC – 2015–16
Angelo Cijntje – Groningen – 2013–14
Kevin Felida – RKC Waalwijk – 2022–
Carlito Fermina – Excelsior – 2018–19
Guyon Fernandez – Excelsior, Feyenoord, PEC Zwolle, Breda – 2010–15
Juriën Gaari – RKC Waalwijk – 2019–
Elson Hooi – NAC, ADO Den Haag – 2012–15, 2017–20
Raily Ignacio – ADO Den Haag – 2009–11
Anton Jongsma – Groningen, RKC Waalwijk – 2001–03, 2009–10
Gervane Kastaneer – ADO Den Haag, NAC Breda, PEC Zwolle – 2005–07, 2008–13, 2021–22
Darryl Lachman – Groningen, PEC Zwolle, Twente, SC Cambuur, Willem II, PEC Zwolle – 2009–11, 2012–20
Michaël Maria – Twente – 2017–18
Cuco Martina – RKC Waalwijk, Twente, Feyenoord, Go Ahead Eagles – 2011–15, 2018–19, 2021–22
Javier Martina – Ajax – 2008–09
Quenten Martinus – Heerenveen – 2010–12
Shelton Martis – Excelsior – 2002–03
Vidarrell Papito Merencia – ADO Den Haag – 2013–15
Rihairo Meulens – Vitesse, Roda JC, Dordrecht – 2006–07, 2009–11, 2014–15
Dustley Mulder – RKC Waalwijk – 2005–10
Justin Ogenia – Willem II – 2019–20
Prince Rajcomar – Utrecht – 2004–05
Eloy Room – Vitesse, Go Ahead Eagles, PSV Eindhoven – 2008–18
Rayvien Rosario – Sparta Rotterdam – 2022–
Orlando Smeekes – FC Volendam – 2003–04
Charlton Vicento – ADO Den Haag, Willem II – 2009–13, 2014–15
Felitciano Zschusschen – Twente, Breda – 2012–15

Cyprus
Costas Costa – Utrecht – 1998–99
Nestoras Mitidis – Roda JC – 2016–17

Czech Republic
Lukáš Bajer – Heracles – 2008–09
Václav Černý – Ajax, Utrecht, Twente – 2015–18, 2019–
Matěj Chaluš – Groningen – 2022–
Marián Chlad – Groningen – 1993–94
Jozef Chovanec – PSV – 1988–91
Pavel Čmovš – NEC – 2011–14
Jaroslav Drobný – ADO Den Haag – 2005–06
Tomáš Galásek – Willem II, Ajax – 1996–2006
Denis Granečný – Emmen – 2020–21
Zdeněk Grygera – Ajax – 2003–07
Tomáš Hájek – Vitesse – 2020–
Josef Jelínek – Go Ahead Eagles – 1970–72
Tomáš Kalas – Vitesse – 2011–13
Milan Kopic – Heerenveen – 2008–10
Josef Kvída – PEC Zwolle – 2016–17
Martin Lejsal – Heerenveen – 2009–10
Jacob Lensky – Feyenoord, Utrecht – 2006–07, 2009–12
Lukáš Mareček – Heerenveen – 2012–13
Dominik Mašek – SC Cambuur – 2015–16
Ondřej Mihálik – AZ – 2017–18
Jaroslav Navrátil – Heracles – 2012–18
Tomáš Necid – PEC Zwolle, ADO Den Haag – 2014–15, 2018–20
Michal Nehoda – De Graafschap – 1999–2000
Jaromír Paciorek – Fortuna Sittard – 1998–2001
Michal Papadopulos – Heerenveen – 2009–11
Paul Quasten – Willem II, RKC Waalwijk – 2008–09, 2019–21
Michal Sadílek – PSV – 2018–
Vojtěch Schulmeister – Heracles – 2008–10
Jan Šeda – RKC Waalwijk – 2013–14
Jarda Simr – NEC, Excelsior – 2001–05, 2006–08
David Střihavka – Willem II – 2011–12
Michal Svec – Heerenveen – 2008–2011
Ondřej Švejdík – Groningen – 2006–10
Vít Valenta – FC Volendam – 2008–09

Democratic Republic of the Congo
Jordan Botaka – Excelsior, Fortuna Sittard – 2014–16, 2021–22
Pedro Kamata – Groningen – 2002–03
Hervé Kage – RKC Waalwijk – 2006–07
Jody Lukoki – Ajax, Cambuur, PEC Zwolle – 2010–15
Gaël Kakuta – Vitesse – 2012–14
Jason Lokilo - Sparta Rotterdam - 2022-
Mike Mampuya – VVV-Venlo – 2007–09
Samuel Moutoussamy – Fortuna Sittard – 2020–21
Jean-Claude Mukanya – Breda – 1996–97
Jonathan Okita – NEC – 2021–22
Abel Tamata – PSV, Roda JC, Groningen – 2010–17
Zico Tumba – De Graafschap, NEC – 1998–04

Denmark
Hans Aabech – Twente, De Graafschap – 1975–77
Joachim Andersen – Twente – 2014–18
Lucas Andersen – Ajax, Willem II – 2012–16
Stephan Andersen – Go Ahead Eagles – 2013–14
Frank Arnesen – Ajax, PSV – 1975–81, 1985–88
Nikolai Baden Frederiksen – Fortuna Sittard, Vitesse – 2019–20, 2021–
Thomas Bælum – Willem II – 2006–08
Allan Bak Jensen – Heerenveen – 2001–02
Kristian Bak Nielsen – Heerenveen – 2007–10
Patrick Banggaard – Roda JC – 2017–18
Mads Bech Sørensen – Groningen – 2022–
Emil Berggreen – Twente – 2019–20
Mika Biereth – RKC Waalwijk – 2022–
Michael Birkedal – Twente – 1981–86
Andreas Bjelland – Twente – 2012–15
Kresten Bjerre – PSV, Go Ahead Eagles – 1968–70, 1977–78
Kasper Bøgelund – PSV – 1999–2005
Nicolai Boilesen – Ajax – 2010–2016
David Boysen – Roda JC – 2016–17
Nicolai Brock-Madsen – PEC Zwolle – 2016–17
Lars Brøgger – Dordrecht '90 – 1994–95
Kenneth Brylle – PSV – 1984–85
Søren Busk – MVV – 1979–82, 1985–86
Oskar Buur – Volendam – 2022–
Kim Christensen – Twente – 2003–05
Martin Christensen – Heracles – 2008
Tommy Christensen – PSV – 1979–81
Kevin Conboy – NEC, Utrecht – 2011–14, 2015–17
Denni Conteh – Sparta Rotterdam – 2002–03
Thomas Dalgaard – Heerenveen – 2014–15
Mohamed Daramy – Ajax – 2021–
Kasper Dolberg – Ajax – 2016–20
Anders Dreyer – Heerenveen – 2019–20
Anders Due – Vitesse – 2006–08
Mikkel Duelund – NEC – 2021–
Riza Durmisi – Sparta Rotterdam – 2021–22
Erik Dyreborg – Holland Sport – 1968–69
Henrik Eigenbrod – AZ – 1982–84
Lars Elstrup – Feyenoord – 1986–88
Thomas Enevoldsen – Groningen – 2009–12
Christian Eriksen – Ajax – 2009–14
John Eriksen – Roda JC, Feyenoord – 1979–84, 1985–86
Oliver Feldballe – Cambuur – 2013–14
Viktor Fischer – Ajax – 2012–16
John Frandsen – NEC, PEC Zwolle – 1973–74, 1978–81
Jan Frederiksen – Excelsior – 2002
Ole Fritsen – GVAV – 1965–70
Benny Gall – Dordrecht '90 – 1994–95
Mathias Gehrt – ADO Den Haag – 2013–2016
Jakob Gregersen – Groningen – 1995–96
Jesper Grønkjær – Ajax – 1998–2000
Jesper Håkansson – Heerenveen, RBC Roosendaal, ADO Den Haag – 1999–2005, 2006–07
Johnny Hansen – Ajax – 1991–93
Martin Hansen – ADO Den Haag – 2014–2016
Michael Hansen – Breda – 1999–2000
Dennis Heine – Den Bosch – 1992–93
Jan Heintze – PSV – 1982–94, 1999–2003
Jørgen Henriksen – Utrecht – 1970–76
Daniel Høegh – Heerenveen – 2017–20
Niels-Christian Holmstrøm – ADO Den Haag – 1969–70
Frederik Holst – Sparta Rotterdam – 2017–18
Ken Ilsø – Heerenveen – 2005–06
Johnny Jacobsen – Feyenoord, Willem II – 1980–83
Michael Jakobsen – PSV – 2003–04
Birger Jensen – RKC Waalwijk – 1988–89
Bjarne Jensen – GVAV, Groningen – 1969–75
Brian Jensen – AZ – 1998–99
Daniel Jensen – Heerenveen – 1998–2003
David Jensen – Utrecht – 2016–19
Henning Jensen – Ajax – 1979–81
Niclas Jensen – PSV – 1996–98
Victor Jensen – Ajax – 2020–22
Allan K. Jepsen – Heerenveen – 1997–99
Timmi Johansen – Heerenveen – 2006–09
Mathias Jørgensen – PSV – 2012–14
Nicolai Jørgensen – Feyenoord – 2016–21
Mads Junker – Vitesse, Roda JC – 2006–12
Simon Karkov – Heerenveen – 1996–97
Morten Karlsen – PEC Zwolle – 2002–04
Jens Kolding – Roda JC – 1976–80
Jørgen Kristensen – Sparta Rotterdam, Feyenoord – 1968–76
Thomas Kristensen – ADO Den Haag – 2014–16
Tommy Kristiansen – Go Ahead Eagles, Feyenoord, HFC Haarlem – 1976–84
Michael Krohn-Dehli – RKC Waalwijk, Ajax, Sparta Rotterdam – 2004–08
Kasper Kusk – Twente – 2014–15
Claus Larsen – Sparta Rotterdam – 1975–76
Kasper Larsen – Groningen – 2015–18
Søren Larsen – Feyenoord – 2010–11
Brian Laudrup – Ajax – 1999–2000
Michael Laudrup – Ajax – 1997–98
Nikolai Laursen – Emmen, Heracles Almelo – 2019–22
Søren Lerby – Ajax, PSV – 1975–83, 1987–90
Søren Lindsted – Twente – 1979–82
Michael Lumb – Feyenoord – 2010–11
Kasper Lunding – Heracles Almelo – 2020–22
Nicolas Madsen – Heerenveen – 2021–22
Ole Madsen – Sparta Rotterdam – 1965–68
Simon Makienok – Utrecht – 2018–20
Nicholas Marfelt – Sparta Rotterdam – 2017–18
Magnus Mattsson – NEC – 2021–
Torben Mikkelsen – Telstar – 1977–78
Jan Mølby – Ajax – 1982–84
Peter Møller – PSV – 1997–98
Patrick Mtiliga – Excelsior, Feyenoord, NAC – 2002–03, 2004–09
Henning Munk Jensen – PSV – 1970–73
Younes Namli – Heerenveen, PEC Zwolle, Sparta Rotterdam – 2014–19, 2022–
Allan Nielsen – Roda JC – 1979–81
Anders Nielsen – PSV, RKC Waalwijk, Sparta Rotterdam – 1996–02
Claus Nielsen – Twente – 1989–91
Ivan Nielsen – Feyenoord, PSV – 1979–90
Lasse Nielsen – NEC – 2013–14
Rasmus Nissen – Ajax – 2017–19
Morten Nordstrand – Groningen – 2009–10
Hjalte Nørregaard – Heerenveen – 2005–06
Kristen Nygaard – AZ – 1972–82
Marc Nygaard – Heerenveen, MVV, Roda JC, Excelsior – 1995–2003
Jens Odgaard – Heerenveen – 2019–20
Jens Odgaard – RKC Waalwijk, AZ Alkmaar – 2021–
Jesper Olsen – Ajax – 1981–84
John Steen Olsen – DOS Utrecht, Utrecht, Feyenoord – 1969–76
Keld Pedersen – GVAV – 1967–69
Nicklas Pedersen – Groningen, Emmen – 2008–12, 2018–19
Kenneth Perez – MVV, AZ, PSV, Ajax, Twente – 1997–2010
Bjarne Petersen – FC Amsterdam – 1975–77
Dan Petersen – Ajax – 1991–94
Jannik Pohl – Groningen – 2018–19
Christian Poulsen – Ajax – 2012–14
Jakob Poulsen – Heerenveen – 2005–08
Simon Poulsen – AZ, PSV – 2007–12, 2013–15, 2015–16
Flemming Povlsen – PSV – 1989–90
Christian Rasmussen – Ajax – 2022–
Jacob Rasmussen – Vitesse, Feyenoord – 2020–
Jesper Rasmussen – PEC Zwolle – 1978–80
Søren Rieks – NEC – 2012–14
Emil Riis Jakobsen – VVV – 2017–18
Dennis Rommedahl – PSV, RKC Waalwijk, Ajax NEC – 1996–2004, 2007–10
Bent Schmidt-Hansen – PSV – 1967–75
Lasse Schöne – De Graafschap, NEC, Ajax, Heerenveen – 2007–19, 2020–
Michael Silberbauer – Utrecht – 2008–11
Arne Skipper – Sparta Rotterdam – 1974–76
Morten Skoubo – Utrecht, Roda JC – 2008–11
Tom Søndergaard – Ajax – 1969–70
Jan Sørensen – Twente, Feyenoord, Excelsior, Ajax – 1982–89
Niels Sörensen – FC Amsterdam – 1975–77
Ole Sørensen – PSV – 1966–68
Peter Sørensen – Groningen – 1996–97
Per Steffensen – Twente – 1989–91
Bo Storm – Heerenveen – 2006–07
Kevin Stuhr Ellegaard – Heerenveen – 2010–11
Anders Sundstrup – AZ – 1982–85
Sebastian Svärd – Roda JC – 2010–11
Jeppe Tengbjerg – Cambuur – 1993–96
Rasmus Thelander – Vitesse – 2018–19
Thomas Thorninger – PSV – 1992–94
Ole Tobiasen – Heerenveen, Ajax, AZ – 1995–2002
Jon Dahl Tomasson – Heerenveen, Feyenoord – 1994–97, 1998–2002, 2008–11
Michael Tørnes – Vitesse – 2016–18
Peter Vindahl Jensen – AZ – 2021–22
Sammy Youssouf – RBC Roosendaal – 2003–05
Sten Ziegler – Roda JC, Ajax – 1974–79, 1980–82
Niki Zimling – NEC, Ajax – 2010–11, 2014–15

Ecuador
Giovanny Espinoza – Vitesse – 2007–08
Renato Ibarra – Vitesse – 2011–15
Édison Méndez – PSV – 2006–09
Diego Palacios – Willem II – 2018–19
Jhonny Quiñónez – Willem II – 2019–20
José Valencia – NEC, Willem II – 2004–09

El Salvador
Enrico Hernández – Vitesse – 2020–22

Egypt
Sherif Ekramy – Feyenoord – 2005–08
Hazem Emam – De Graafschap – 1998–2000
Haytham Farouk – Feyenoord – 1996–97
Hossam Ghaly – Feyenoord – 2003–06
Mido – Ajax – 2001–03, 2010–11

England
Billy Ashcroft – Twente – 1982–83, 1984–85
Jean-Michel d'Avray – NEC – 1990–91
Colin Ayre – Telstar – 1975–76
Lewis Baker – Vitesse – 2015–17
Michael Ball – PSV – 2005–06
Dave Bennett – MVV – 1984–85
Omar Bogle – ADO Den Haag – 2019–20
Jarrad Branthwaite – PSV – 2022–
Gary Brooke – Groningen – 1988–89
Isaiah Brown – Vitesse – 2015–16
Isaac Buckley-Ricketts – Twente – 2017–18
Mark Burke – Fortuna Sittard – 1995–99
Greg Campbell – Sparta Rotterdam – 1987–89
Roy Carey – PSV – 1957–58
Lee Cattermole – VVV-Venlo – 2019–20
Max Clark – Vitesse – 2018–20
Ray Clarke – Sparta Rotterdam, Ajax – 1976–79
Jake Clarke-Salter – Vitesse – 2018–19
Charlie Colkett – Vitesse – 2017–18
Steve Cooper – NAC – 1984–85
George Cox – Fortuna Sittard – 2019–
Daniel Crowley – Go Ahead Eagles, Willem II – 2016–19
Fankaty Dabo – Vitesse – 2017–18
George Dobson – Sparta Rotterdam – 2017–18
Louie Donowa – Willem II – 1988–89
Andrew Driver – De Graafschap – 2015–16
Mark Duffy – ADO Den Haag – 2019–20
Chris Eagles – NEC – 2006–07
Graham Edwards – VVV-Venlo – 1959–61
Marcus Edwards – Excelsior – 2018–19
Shay Facey – Heerenveen – 2016–17
Mark Farrington – Willem II, Fortuna Sittard, Feyenoord – 1987–88, 1989–91
Josh Flint – Volendam – 2022–
Jamie Forrester – Utrecht – 1999–2000
Ron Futcher – NAC – 1984–85
Douglas George – HFC Haarlem, Sparta Rotterdam – 1974–80, 1982–83
Steve Goble – Groningen, Utrecht – 1981–83, 1984–86
Ronny Goodlass – FC Den Haag, NAC – 1977–80
Chris Guthrie – Willem II, Roda JC – 1982–85
Gary Heale – Sparta Rotterdam – 1982–83
Phil Henson – Sparta Rotterdam – 1977–78
Michael Higdon – NEC – 2013–14
Gordon Hill – Twente – 1985–86
James Horsfield – Breda – 2017–18
Sam Hutchinson – Vitesse – 2013–14
Geoff Hutt – HFC Haarlem – 1976–77
Michael Jeffrey – Fortuna Sittard – 1995–99
David Jones – NEC – 2005–06
Todd Kane – NEC – 2015–16
Joe Keenan – Willem II – 2005–07
Joel Latibeaudiere – Twente – 2019–20
Terry Lees – Sparta Rotterdam, Roda JC, DS'79 – 1976–79, 1982–84
John Linford – DS'79, NAC, Fortuna Sittard, Utrecht – 1983–91
David Loggie – Sparta Rotterdam, AZ, Willem II – 1980–82, 1983–91
Noni Madueke – PSV – 2019–
Keith Masefield – HFC Haarlem – 1977–88
Paul Mason – Groningen – 1983–88
Teddy Maybank – PSV – 1980–81
Rob McDonald – FC Wageningen, Willem II, Groningen, PSV – 1980–87
Josh McEachran – Vitesse – 2014–15 
Tony McNulty – PEC Zwolle – 1986–87
Tafari Moore – Utrecht – 2016–17
Nicky Morgan – FC Den Haag – 1981–82
Tony Morley – FC Den Haag – 1986–87
Mason Mount – Vitesse – 2017–18
Derry Murkin – Volendam – 2022–
Reiss Nelson – Feyenoord – 2021–22
Gordon Nutt – PSV – 1961–62
Stuart Parker – Sparta Rotterdam – 1978–79
Marcus Phillips – Utrecht – 1995–96
Duncan Pratt – HFC Haarlem, NEC – 1976–80
Richie Reynolds – HFC Haarlem – 1976–77
Ray Richardson – Heracles, AZ, RKC Waalwijk – 1985–87, 1990–93
Peter Robinson – Sparta Rotterdam – 1980–82
Bassala Sambou – Fortuna Sittard – 2019–22
Jerome Sinclair – VVV-Venlo – 2019–20
Mike Small – Go Ahead Eagles – 1982–85, 1986–87
Dominic Solanke – Vitesse – 2015–16
Jordan Spence – ADO Den Haag – 2019–20
Phil Starbuck – RKC Waalwijk – 1996–97
Floyd Streete – Utrecht – 1983–84
Easah Suliman – Emmen – 2018–19
Sam Stubbs – ADO Den Haag – 2019–20
Peter Thomson – NAC – 1998–2000
John Webb – MVV – 1978–80
Trevor Whymark – Sparta Rotterdam – 1979–80
Dean Wilkins – PEC Zwolle – 1984–85, 1986–87
Matty Willock – Utrecht – 2017–18
Carl Wilson – Sparta Rotterdam – 1962–63
Colin Withers – Go Ahead Eagles – 1970–71
Andy Wright – Fortuna Sittard – 2001–02
Kevin Young – Utrecht – 1986–90

Estonia
Ragnar Klavan – Heracles, AZ – 2005–12
Marko Meerits – Vitesse – 2011–12
Karol Mets – Breda – 2017–19
Henrik Ojamaa – Go Ahead Eagles – 2016–17
Andres Oper – Roda JC, ADO Den Haag – 2005–10
Raio Piiroja – Vitesse – 2011–12
Rocco Robert Shein – Utrecht – 2021–

Finland
Oliver Antman – Groningen – 2022–
Jasin Assehnoun – Emmen – 2022–
Hannu Haarala – Heerenveen – 2002–05
Juha Hakola – Heracles, Willem II – 2008–11
Sami Hyypiä  – Willem II – 1995–99
Fredrik Jensen – Twente – 2016–18
Richard Jensen – Twente – 2017–18
Aleksei Kangaskolkka – Heracles – 2013–14
Rasmus Karjalainen – Fortuna Sittard – 2019–20
Joonas Kolkka – Willem II, PSV, ADO Den Haag, Feyenoord, NAC – 1995–2001, 2005–11
Marko Kolsi – Willem II – 2004–06
Peter Kopteff – Utrecht – 2006–08
Jukka Koskinen – Willem II – 1997–99
Jussi Kujala – De Graafschap – 2010–12
Juha-Pekka Laine – MVV – 1975–76
Thomas Lam – AZ, PEC Zwolle, Twente – 2012–13, 2014–16, 2017–22
Veli Lampi – Willem II – 2010–11
Mika Lipponen – Twente – 1985–89
Jari Litmanen – Ajax – 1992–99, 2002–04
Niki Mäenpää – Willem II, VVV-Venlo – 2009–11, 2012–13
Niklas Moisander – AZ, Ajax – 2008–15
Jussi Nuorela – Groningen – 1994–95
Mika Nurmela – Heerenveen, Heracles – 1999–2003, 2005–06
Marco Parnela – FC Zwolle – 2003–04
Petri Pasanen – Ajax – 2000–04
Mika Pulkkinen – Heerenveen – 1999–2000
Timo Rahja – MVV – 1974–75
Mikko Rahkamaa – Twente – 2002–04
Jukka Raitala – Heerenveen – 2012–15
Patrik Raitanen – Fortuna Sittard – 2019–20
Juha Reini – AZ – 2002–04, 2005–06
Paulus Roiha – Utrecht, FC Zwolle, ADO Den Haag – 2001–04, 2005–07
Janne Saksela – Sparta Rotterdam – 2016–17, 2018–19
Tim Sparv – Groningen – 2009–13
Antti Sumiala – NEC, Twente – 1995–99
Teemu Tainio – Ajax – 2010–11
Niklas Tarvajärvi – Heerenveen, De Graafschap, Vitesse – 2005–09
Petri Tiainen – Ajax – 1986–88
Ville Väisänen – De Graafschap – 1997–2000
Mika Väyrynen – Heerenveen, PSV – 2001–11

France
Thierry Ambrose – Breda – 2017–18
Rémi Amieux – NEC, RKC Waalwijk, NAC – 2010–15
Grégoire Amiot – Fortuna Sittard – 2019–21
Mathieu Assou-Ekotto – Willem II – 2005–07
Samy Baghdadi – Fortuna Sittard – 2021–22
Jean-Christophe Bahebeck – Utrecht – 2017–18
Jean-David Beauguel – RKC Waalwijk – 2013–14
Lucas Bernadou – Emmen – 2020–
Olivier Boscagli – PSV – 2019–
Jérémie Bréchet – PSV – 2008–09
Teddy Chevalier – RKC Waalwijk – 2012–13
Cyril Chevreuil – Sparta Rotterdam – 2016–17
Karim Coulibaly – Willem II – 2017–20
Joris Delle – NEC, Feyenoord – 2016–17, 2018–19
Matthieu Delpierre – Utrecht – 2013–14
Mahamadou Dembélé – Fortuna Sittard – 2018–19
Dorian Dervite – Breda – 2018–19
David Di Tommaso – Utrecht – 2004–06
Djibril Dianessy – Fortuna Sittard – 2018–19, 2020–21 
Marc Olivier Doue – PEC Zwolle – 2019–21
Édouard Duplan – Sparta Rotterdam, Utrecht, ADO Den Haag – 2007–18
Julien Escudé – Ajax – 2003–06
Marc-Antoine Fortuné – Utrecht – 2005–07
Nicolas Gavory – Utrecht – 2018–19
Yann Gboho – Vitesse – 2021–22
Prince-Désir Gouano – RKC Waalwijk – 2013–14
Vincent Gouttebarge – FC Volendam – 1997–98
Nicolas Isimat-Mirin – PSV – 2014–19
Albert Lottin - Utrecht - 2022-
Zinédine Machach – VVV-Venlo – 2020–21
Didier Martel – Utrecht, Vitesse – 1998–2003
Robin Maulun – Cambuur – 2021–
Marko Muslin – Willem II – 2005–06
Louis Nganioni – Utrecht – 2015–16
Hervin Ongenda – PEC Zwolle – 2016–17
Florian Pinteaux – Sparta Rotterdam – 2016–17
Modibo Sagnan – Utrecht – 2022–
Florent Sanchez – Volendam – 2022–
Yaya Sanogo – Ajax – 2015–16
Sébastien Sansoni – Vitesse – 2006–09
Moussa Sylla – Utrecht – 2020–
Azzeddine Toufiqui – Emmen – 2022–
Rémy Vita - Fortuna Sittard - 2022-
Romaric Yapi – Vitesse – 2021–
Arthur Zagre – Utrecht – 2021–

Gabon
Kévin Mayi – NEC – 2016–17
David Sambissa – Cambuur – 2021–

Gambia
Jatto Ceesay – Willem II – 1995–2006
Leon Guwara – Utrecht, VVV-Venlo – 2018–21
Ebrima Ebou Sillah – RBC Roosendaal – 2002–03, 2005–06
Edrissa Sonko – Roda JC – 2000–07

Georgia
Giorgi Aburjania – Twente – 2019–20
Archil Arveladze – NAC – 1997–2000
Shota Arveladze – Ajax, AZ – 1997–2001, 2005–07
Giorgi Chanturia – Vitesse – 2011–14
Giorgi Demetradze – Feyenoord – 1997–98
Giorgi Gakhokidze – PSV, Twente – 1998–99, 2000–07
Guram Kashia – Vitesse – 2010–18
Valeri Kazaishvili – Vitesse – 2011–17
Georgi Kinkladze – Ajax – 1998–99

Germany

A
Ragnar Ache – Sparta Rotterdam – 2016–18, 2019–20
Atakan Akkaynak – Willem II – 2018–19
Etienne Amenyido – VVV-Venlo – 2017–18
Marcel Appiah – NEC – 2014–16
Wolfram Arnthof – Heracles – 1962–66
Jonas Arweiler – Utrecht, ADO Den Haag – 2019–21
Ralf Augustin – Fortuna Sittard – 1982–83
Maxime Awoudja - Excelsior - 2022-

B
Benjamin Baltes – Excelsior – 2010–11
Oliver Batista Meier – Heerenveen – 2020–21
Timo Baumgartl – PSV – 2019–21
Joep Beckers – Sittardia – 1959–65
Willy Bergstein – MVV – 1965–67
Jan-Niklas Beste – Emmen – 2019–20
Horst Blankenburg – Ajax – 1970–75
Janis Blaswich – Heracles Almelo – 2018–22
Uwe Blotenberg – Twente, FC Wageningen – 1969–70, 1974–75
Robert Böhm – VVV-Venlo – 2009–10
Herbert Bönnen – NEC – 1967–72
Axel Borgmann – VVV-Venlo – 2018–19
Mirco Born – Twente – 2012–13
Can Bozdoğan – Utrecht – 2022–
Enis Bunjaki – Twente – 2016–17
Dieter Burdenski – Vitesse – 1990–91
Gerd Burkhardt – Blauw-Wit – 1963–64

C
Julian Chabot – Sparta Rotterdam, Groningen – 2017–19
Christian Conteh – Feyenoord – 2020
Simon Cziommer – Twente, Roda JC, AZ, Utrecht, Vitesse, Heracles – 2000–09, 2012–15
Lennart Czyborra – Heracles – 2018–20

D
Dominique Diroux – Breda – 1996–98
Christian Dorda – Heracles, Utrecht – 2012–14

E
Chinedu Ede – Twente – 2015–17
Dennis Eckert – Excelsior – 2018–19
Mario Engels – Roda JC, Sparta Rotterdam – 2017–18, 2020–
Paul Ewe – Rapid JC – 1961–62

F
Adrian Fein – PSV – 2020–21
Dimitrios Ferfelis – PEC Zwolle – 2014–15
Herbert Finken – Heracles – 1962–64
Uwe Fischer – Fortuna '54, Fortuna SC – 1966–69
André Fomitschow – NEC – 2016–17
Helmuth Fottner – SC Enschede – 1957–58
Wolfgang Frank – AZ – 1973–74

G
Nelson Gonçalves da Costa – Twente – 2003–04
Lukas Görtler – Utrecht – 2017–19
Robin Gosens – Dordrecht, Heracles – 2014–17
Volker Graul – Den Bosch – 1972–73
Dieter Gresens – RKSV Sittardia – 1964–65
Ashton Götz – Roda JC – 2017–18
Mario Götze – PSV – 2020–22
Volkmar Groß – Twente – 1974–77

H
Julian von Haacke – NEC – 2016–17
Philipp Haastrup – Willem II – 2012–13
Tobias Haitz – NEC – 2013–14
Tim Handwerker – Groningen – 2018–19
Georg Hecht – MVV – 1956–58
Niclas Heimann – VVV-Venlo – 2012–13
Ogechika Heil – Go Ahead Eagles – 2021–22
Michael Heinloth – NEC – 2016–18
Christoph Hemlein – NEC – 2013–14
Herbert Herbst – Rapid JC – 1962
Lorenz Hilkes – VVV-Venlo – 1974–75, 1979–80
Heinz Höher – Twente – 1965–66
Tim Hölscher – Twente – 2012–17
Jannik Huth – Sparta Rotterdam – 2017–18

J
Sebastian Jakubiak – Heracles – 2017–18, 2019–20
Dieter Janssen – VVV-Venlo – 1961–62
Jürgen Jendrossek – NEC – 1969–71

K
Josef Kaczor – Feyenoord – 1981–82
Jörg Kaessmann – Roda JC – 1997–98
Herbert Kalz – Rapid JC – 1957–58
Wolfram Kaminke – DOS Utrecht – 1968–69
Orestis Kiomourtzoglou – Heracles – 2019–22
Thorsten Kirschbaum – VVV-Venlo – 2019–21
Benjamin Kirsten – NEC – 2015–16
Georg Koch – PSV – 1997–98
Mats Köhlert – Willem II, Heerenveen – 2019–
Derrick Köhn – Willem II – 2020–22
Guido Kopp – VVV-Venlo – 1984–86
Werner Korndörfer – Breda – 1972
Willi Kraus – Go Ahead Eagles – 1963–64
Franz Krauthausen – FC Volendam – 1977–78
Florian Krüger – Groningen – 2022–
Günther Kurek – NEC – 1981–82

L
Georg Lambert – Willem II, USV Elinkwijk – 1960–62, 1966–67
Alexander Laukart – Twente – 2017–18
Rolf Lendzian – SC Enschede – 1961–62
Thilo Leugers – Twente, NAC – 2010–13
Heinz Libuda – GVAV – 1966–67
Peter Lübeke – Ajax – 1977–78
Kilian Ludewig – Willem II – 2021–22
Andreas Ludwig – Utrecht – 2015–17

M
Matthias Maiwald – DOS Utrecht, Feyenoord, Go Ahead Eagles – 1967–75
Philipp Max – PSV – 2020–
Thomas Meißner – ADO Den Haag, Willem II – 2016–19
Kai Michalke – Heracles – 2006–08
Jürgen Müller – Willem II, PEC Zwolle – 1983–85

N
Gerrit Nauber – Go Ahead Eagles – 2021–
Nico Neidhart – Emmen – 2018–19
Richard Neudecker – VVV – 2019–20
Peter Niemeyer – Twente – 2002–07
Horst Nussbaum – PSV – 1965–66
Reagy Ofosu – NEC – 2016–17
Samir Ouindi – Roda JC – 2000–01

O
Eric Oelschlägel – Utrecht – 2020–

P
Tobias Pachonik – VVV-Venlo – 2019–22
Dragan Paljić – Heracles – 2012–14
Erwin Palm – MVV – 1975–76
Felix Passlack – Fortuna Sittard – 2019–20
Nico Pellatz – Excelsior – 2010–11
Hans Pfeiffer – SC Enschede – 1960–62
Michael Pfeiffer – Fortuna '54 – 1961–63
David Philipp – ADO Den Haag – 2020–
Martin Pieckenhagen – Heracles – 2005–10
Sebastian Polter – Fortuna Sittard – 2020–21
Gerrit Pressel – Willem II – 2010–11
Manfred Priewe – NEC – 1973–75
Nick Proschwitz – Sparta Rotterdam – 2017–18

R
Helmut Rahn – SC Enschede – 1960–63
Willy Reitgaßl – RKSV Sittardia – 1967–68
Marco Rente – Heracles – 2020–22
Kurt Rettkowski – Go Ahead Eagles, VVV – 1974–79
Norbert Ringels – VVV-Venlo – 1985–87
Paulo Rink – Vitesse – 2003–04
Ferdi Rohde – Twente – 1980–84
Nils Röseler – Twente, VVV-Venlo – 2011–14, 2017–20
Maximilian Rossmann – Heracles – 2018–20

S
Stephen Sama – Heracles – 2018–19
Werner Schaaphok – Ajax – 1959–65
Steffen Schäfer – VVV-Venlo – 2019–21
Dani Schahin – Roda JC – 2016–18
Lukas Schmitz – VVV-Venlo – 2020–21
Sam Schreck – Groningen – 2019–21
Markus Schubert – Vitesse – 2021–
Daniel Schwaab – PSV – 2016–20
Dieter Schwemmle – Twente – 1973–74
Sepp Seemann – SC Enschede – 1957–58
Dieter Sevens – NEC – 1979–80
Jörg Sobiech – NEC, Twente – 1996–2000
Sven Sonnenberg – Heracles Almelo – 2021–22
Elia Soriano – VVV-Venlo – 2019–20
Karl–Heinz Spikofski – VVV-Venlo – 1957–59
Arno Steffenhagen – Ajax – 1974–76
Rico Steinmann – Twente – 1997–2000
Horst-Dieter Strich – PSV – 1965–66
Rico Strieder – Utrecht, PEC Zwolle – 2015–22
Marcel Stutter – NEC – 2012–14
Ulrich Surau – NEC – 1977–79
Anthony Syhre – Fortuna Sittard – 2018–19

T
Stefan Thesker – Twente – 2015–18
Rolf Thiemann – Go Ahead Eagles – 1963–67
Lennart Thy – VVV-Venlo, PEC Zwolle, Sparta Rotterdam – 2017–22
Idrissa Touré – Vitesse – 2020–21
Tom Trybull – ADO Den Haag – 2016–17

U
Lars Unnerstall – VVV-Venlo, PSV, Twente – 2017–
Mark Uth – Heerenveen, Heracles – 2012–15

V
Jochen Vieten – VVV-Venlo – 1976–79
Karl Vigna – MVV – 1960–61
Alexander Voigt – Roda JC – 2005–06

W
Werner Weigel – MVV – 1965–66
Bastian Weiser – NEC – 2009–10
Timon Wellenreuther – Willem II, Feyenoord – 2017–20, 2021–
Heiko Westermann – Ajax – 2016–17
Felix Wiedwald – Emmen – 2020–21
Jean Willrich – PSV – 1976–77
Maximilian Wittek – Vitesse – 2020–

Y
John Yeboah – VVV-Venlo, Willem II – 2019–22
Amin Younes – Ajax – 2015–18

Z
André van der Zander – Fortuna Sittard – 1993–96
Kurt Zaro – Willem II – 1957–60
Michael Zetterer – PEC Zwolle – 2019–21

Ghana
Eric Addo – PSV, Roda JC – 1999–2011
Joseph Addo – Sparta Rotterdam – 1996–97
Thomas Agyepong – Twente – 2015–16
Patrick Allotey – Feyenoord – 1998–99
Matthew Amoah – Vitesse, Fortuna Sittard, NAC, Heracles – 1998–2012, 2013–14
Anthony Annan – Vitesse – 2011–12
Nana Asare – Utrecht – 2009–13
Christian Atsu – Vitesse – 2013–14
Eric Atuahene – Breda – 2004–05
Emmanuel Boakye – Ajax, Heracles, Sparta Rotterdam – 2005–11
Richmond Boakye – Roda JC – 2015–16
Francis Dickoh – Utrecht – 2006–10
Augustus Dumbar – RKC Waalwijk – 1997–99
Shadrach Eghan – Twente – 2012–16
Christian Gyan – Feyenoord, Excelsior – 1997–2007
Edwin Gyasi – De Graafschap, Twente, Heracles, Roda JC – 2011–16
Elvis Hammond – RBC Roosendaal – 2004–05
Ali Ibrahim Pelé – De Graafschap – 1996–98
Abass Issah – Utrecht, Twente – 2019–21
Abdul Rahman Issah – De Graafschap – 1999–2000
Laryea Kingston – Vitesse – 2010–11
Mohammed Kudus – Ajax – 2020–
Samuel Kuffour – Ajax – 2007–08
Nii Lamptey – PSV – 1993–94
Odartey Lawson – Utrecht – 1997–98
Elvis Manu – Feyenoord, Cambuur, Go Ahead Eagles – 2011–15, 2016–17
Dauda Mohammed – Vitesse – 2018–19
Divine Naah – Breda – 2014–15
Anthony Obodai – Ajax, Sparta Rotterdam, RKC Waalwijk – 2003–10
Quincy Owusu-Abeyie – NEC – 2016–17
Prince Polley – Sparta Rotterdam, Twente, Heerenveen – 1988–90, 1992–95
Robin Polley – ADO Den Haag, Heracles – 2019–20, 2021–22
Kwame Quansah – Ajax, Heracles – 2000–01, 2005–14
Kamal Sowah – AZ Alkmaar – 2021–22
Kwasi Okyere Wriedt – Willem II – 2020–22
Abubakari Yakubu – Ajax, Vitesse – 1999–2009
Yaw Yeboah – Twente – 2016–17

Greece
Yannis Anastasiou – Roda JC, Ajax, Sparta Rotterdam – 2000–07
Aventis Aventisian – Go Ahead Eagles – 2021–
Vasilis Barkas – Utrecht – 2022–
Giannis-Fivos Botos – Go Ahead Eagles – 2021–22
Kostas Chaniotakis – Vitesse – 1998–2000
Angelos Charisteas – Ajax, Feyenoord – 2004–07
Kostas Dedeletakis – De Graafschap – 2000–01
Anastasios Donis – VVV-Venlo – 2020–21
Christos Donis – VVV-Venlo – 2020–21
Anastasios Douvikas – Utrecht – 2021–
James Efmorfidis – RKC Waalwijk – 2020–21
Dimitrios Emmanouilidis – Fortuna Sittard – 2020–21
Giorgos Giakoumakis – VVV-Venlo – 2020–21
Pantelis Hatzidiakos – AZ – 2015–
Dimitrios Ioannidis – Fortuna Sittard – 2018–20
Nikolaos Ioannidis – PEC Zwolle – 2014–15
Argyris Kampetsis – Willem II – 2021–22
Thanasis Karagounis – PEC Zwolle – 2013–18
Nikos Karelis – ADO Den Haag – 2020–21
Giorgos Katsikas – Twente – 2015–17
Dimitris Kolovos – Willem II – 2018–19
Kostas Lamprou – Feyenoord, Willem II, Ajax, RKC Waalwijk – 2012–19, 2020–22
Lazaros Lamprou – Fortuna Sittard, Twente, Excelsior – 2018–19, 2020–21, 2022-
Dimitris Limnios – Twente – 2021–22
Konstantinos Loumpoutis – Twente, ADO Den Haag – 2005–07
Nikos Machlas – Vitesse, Ajax – 1996–2003
Giannis Masouras – Sparta Rotterdam – 2021–22
Nikolaos Michelis – Willem II – 2021–22
Kostas Mitroglou – PSV – 2019–20
Thanasis Papazoglou – Roda JC – 2016–17
Vangelis Pavlidis – Willem II, AZ – 2018–
Lazaros Rota – Fortuna Sittard – 2020-21
Georgios Samaras – Heerenveen – 2002–06
Andreas Samaris – Fortuna Sittard – 2021–22
Dimitris Siovas – Fortuna Sittard – 2021–
Vasilios Sourlis – Fortuna Sittard – 2022–
Konstantinos Tsimikas – Willem II – 2017–18
Gregor Tsinos – Roda JC – 1980–82
Christos Tzolis – Twente – 2022–
Marios Vrousai – Willem II – 2018–20

Guadeloupe
Franck Grandel – Utrecht – 2005–08
Loïc Loval – De Graafschap, Utrecht – 2004–05, 2007–10

Guatemala
Marco Pappa – Heerenveen – 2012–13

Guinea
Antoine Conde – Breda – 2000–01
Mikael Dyrestam – NEC – 2015–17
Ahmad Mendes Moreira – Groningen – 2018–19
Mathias Pogba – Sparta Rotterdam – 2016–17
Sekou Soumah – Willem II – 1992–95
Mohamed Sylla – Willem II – 1989–95
Sekou Sylla – Cambuur – 2021–

Guinea Bissau
Edgar Ié – Feyenoord – 2019–20
Janio Bikel – Heerenveen, NEC – 2014–17
Francisco Júnior – Vitesse – 2013–14

Guyana
Terell Ondaan – Willem II, Excelsior, Zwolle – 2014–19

Haiti
Carlens Arcus – Vitesse – 2022–
Kim Jaggy – Sparta Rotterdam – 2008–09
Jhondly van der Meer – Cambuur – 2021–
Richelor Sprangers – Breda – 2017–18

Hungary
Krisztián Adorján – Groningen – 2013–14
Gábor Babos – NAC, Feyenoord, NEC – 2000–13
Ferenc Banky – MVV – 1959–60
Janos Bedl – DWS, MVV – 1960–62, 1963–64
Janos Beke – Telstar – 1964–65
András Béres – SC Enschede – 1957–59
Béla Bodnár – Sparta Rotterdam – 1962–64
László Bodnár – Roda JC – 2004–06
Boldizsár Bodor – Roda JC, NAC – 2004–11, 2013–14
Miklós Dacsev – VV DOS – 1962–65
Áron Dobos – Fortuna Sittard – 2018–19
Tibor Dombi – Utrecht – 2000–02
Balázs Dzsudzsák – PSV – 2007–11
Csaba Fehér – NAC, PSV, Willem II – 2000–11
Pál Fischer – Ajax – 1989–90
János Hanek – DOS Utrecht – 1960–62
Gábor Horváth – NAC, ADO Den Haag – 2011–13
Ádám Hrepka – NEC – 2007–08
Tamás Kádár – Roda JC – 2012–13
István Kenderesi – Twente – 1970–71
Zsombor Kerekes – Willem II – 2005–07
Gábor Keresztes – Willem II – 1962–64
Milos Kerkez – AZ – 2022–
József Kiprich – Feyenoord – 1989–95
Tamás Kiss – Cambuur – 2021–22
Attila Ladinsky – Feyenoord – 1971–73
Barna Liebháber – AZ, Utrecht – 1969–70, 1974–75
György Lipták – DOS Utrecht, Telstar – 1960–66
Tibor Lőrincz – Alkmaar '54 – 1960–63
László Mészáros – Fortuna Sittard – 2001–02
Antal Nagy – Twente – 1969–72
Gyula Nemes – SC Enschede, Twente, MVV – 1962–70
Krisztián Németh – RKC Waalwijk, Roda JC – 2011–14
Kenny Otigba – Heerenveen – 2012–16
Tamás Pető – Breda – 2001–07
Sándor Popovics – Sparta Rotterdam – 1963–64
Balázs Rabóczki – Vitesse – 2007–08
Antal Róth – Feyenoord – 1986–90
András Simon – Excelsior – 2010–11
Krisztián Simon – Feyenoord – 2010–11
József Szalma – Fortuna Sittard – 1991–94
István Szekér – Willem II – 1997–98
Zoltán Szélesi – NEC – 2012–14
Adrián Szőke – Heracles – 2019–22
Gábor Torma – Roda JC, Groningen, RKC Waalwijk – 1997–02, 2003–04
Balázs Tóth – VVV-Venlo – 2010–11
Krisztián Vadócz – NEC – 2011–12
László Vardai – MVV – 1964–65
Zoltán Varga – Ajax – 1973–74
Krisztián Vermes – Sparta Rotterdam – 2008–09
Kristopher Vida – De Graafschap – 2015–16
Gábor Zele – Twente – 1974–76

Iceland
Mikael Anderson – Excelsior – 2018–19
Andri Baldursson – NEC – 2022–
Gunnar Einarsson – MVV – 1997–98
Kristján Emilsson – NEC – 2015–16
Alfreð Finnbogason – Heerenveen – 2012–14
Eiður Guðjohnsen – PSV Eindhoven – 1995–96
Joey Guðjónsson – MVV, RKC Waalwijk, AZ – 1999–02, 2006–07
Albert Guðmundsson – PSV Eindhoven, AZ – 2017–22
Jóhann Berg Guðmundsson – AZ – 2010–14
Aron Gunnarsson – AZ – 2007–08
Arnar Gunnlaugsson – Feyenoord – 1992–94
Hannes Þór Halldórsson – NEC – 2015–16
Jóhannes Harðarson – Groningen – 2001–04
Heimir Karlsson – Excelsior – 1984–85
Kristófer Kristinsson – Willem II – 2017–19
Ögmundur Kristinsson – Excelsior – 2017–18
Elías Már Ómarsson – Excelsior – 2018–19
Victor Pálsson – NEC – 2012–14
Pétur Pétursson – Feyenoord – 1978–81, 1984–85
Kolbeinn Sigþórsson – AZ, Ajax – 2010–15
Arnór Smárason – Heerenveen – 2007–10
Grétar Steinsson – AZ – 2005–08
Arnar Viðarsson – Twente, De Graafschap – 2005–08
Willum Þór Willumsson – Go Ahead Eagles – 2022–

Indonesia
Irfan Bachdim – Utrecht – 2007–08
Jhon van Beukering – Vitesse, PEC Zwolle, De Graafschap, NEC, Feyenoord – 2000–05, 2007–09, 2010–11
Stefano Lilipaly – Utrecht – 2011–12

Iran
Saeid Janfada – VVV-Venlo – 1990–94
Reza Ghoochannejhad – Heerenveen, PEC Zwolle – 2005–06, 2008–09, 2016–18, 2019–21
Alireza Jahanbakhsh – NEC, AZ, Feyenoord – 2013–18, 2021–
Agil Etemadi – De Graafschap – 2018–19

Iraq
Nashat Akram – Twente – 2009–10

Ireland
Jack Byrne – SC Cambuur – 2015–16
Mick Byrne – ADO Den Haag – 1987–88
David Connolly – Feyenoord – 1997–98, 2000–01
John Delamere – PEC Zwolle – 1981–82
Peter Fitzgerald – Sparta Rotterdam – 1959–60
Ryan Johansson – Fortuna Sittard – 2021–22
Liam Kelly – Feyenoord – 2019–20
Paul McGee – Haarlem – 1986–87
Frank Stapleton – Ajax – 1987–88

Israel
Eli Dasa – Vitesse – 2019–22
Ilay Elmkies – ADO Den Haag – 2020–21
Ariel Harush – Sparta Rotterdam, Heerenveen – 2019–20
Motti Ivanir – Roda JC – 1986–88
Ohad Levita – RKC Waalwijk – 2009–11
Ofir Marciano – Feyenoord – 2021–
Haim Megrelashvili – Vitesse – 2007–09
Dan Mori – Vitesse – 2012–14
Nico Olsak – RKC Waalwijk – 2020–21
Ben Sahar – De Graafschap – 2008–09, Willem II – 2014–15
Samuel Scheimann – Excelsior – 2011–12
Gil Vermouth – De Graafschap – 2011–12
Sheran Yeini – Vitesse – 2015–17
Eran Zahavi – PSV – 2020–22

Italy
Kingsley Boateng – NAC – 2014–15
Luca Caldirola – Vitesse – 2010–11
Gianmarco Cangiano – Fortuna Sittard – 2022–
Marco De Marchi – Vitesse – 1997–2000
Dario Del Fabro – ADO Den Haag – 2020–21
Lorenzo Lucca – Ajax – 2022–
Federico Mattiello – Go Ahead Eagles – 2022–
Andrea Mei – VVV-Venlo – 2011–12
Gaetano Oristanio – Volendam – 2022–
Graziano Pellè – AZ, Feyenoord – 2007–11, 2012–14
Giacomo Quagliata – Heracles – 2020–22
Paolo Ramora – Roda JC – 2000–02
Stefano Ricci – RBC – 2000–01
Gianluca Scamacca – PEC Zwolle – 2018–19
Alessandro Tripaldelli – PEC Zwolle – 2018–19
Luciano Valente – Groningen – 2022–

Ivory Coast
Wilfried Bony – Vitesse, NEC Nijmegen – 2010–13, 2021–22
Sekou Cissé – Roda JC, Feyenoord – 2004–09, 2010–14
Sébastien Haller – Utrecht, Ajax – 2014–17, 2020–22
Bonaventure Kalou – Feyenoord, Heerenveen – 1997–2003, 2008–10
Salomon Kalou – Feyenoord – 2003–06
Wilfried Kanon – ADO Den Haag – 2013–20
Arouna Koné – Roda JC, PSV – 2003–08
Ibrahim Sangaré – PSV – 2020–
Cheick Tioté – Roda JC, Twente – 2007–11

Jamaica
Greg Leigh – Breda – 2018–19
Ravel Morrison – ADO Den Haag – 2020–21

Japan
Robert Cullen – VVV-Venlo – 2011–13
Ritsu Doan – Groningen, PSV – 2017–20, 2021–22
Toshiya Fujita – Utrecht – 2003–04
Mike Havenaar – Vitesse, ADO Den Haag – 2011–14, 2015–17 
Sōta Hirayama – Heracles – 2005–06
Keisuke Honda – VVV-Venlo, Vitesse – 2007–08, 2009–10, 2019–20
Ko Itakura – Groningen – 2019–2021
Yuki Kobayashi – Heerenveen – 2016–19
Naoki Maeda – Utrecht – 2022–
Ryo Miyaichi – Feyenoord, Twente – 2010–11, 2014–15
Tatsuya Mochizuki – HFC Haarlem – 1982–85
Keito Nakamura – Twente – 2019–20
Yuta Nakayama – PEC Zwolle – 2019–22
Shinji Ono – Feyenoord – 2001–05
Kosuke Ota – Vitesse – 2015–17
Yūki Ōtsu – VVV-Venlo – 2012–13
Koki Saito – Sparta Rotterdam – 2022–
Yukinari Sugawara – AZ – 2019–
Yoshiaki Takagi – Utrecht – 2011–13
Kazuyuki Toda – ADO Den Haag – 2003–04
Sai van Wermeskerken – Dordrecht, PEC Zwolle, SC Cambuur – 2014–15, 2019–
Michihiro Yasuda – Vitesse – 2010–13
Maya Yoshida – VVV-Venlo – 2010–13

Kazakhstan
Alexander Merkel – Heracles – 2018–20
Georgy Zhukov – Roda JC – 2015–16

Kosovo
 Donis Avdijaj – Roda JC, Willem II, Emmen – 2017–19, 2020–21
Destan Bajselmani – PEC Zwolle – 2019–22
 Sinan Bytyqi – Cambuur, Go Ahead Eagles – 2014–15, 2016–17
 Bersant Celina – Twente – 2016–17
Toni Domgjoni – Vitesse – 2021–
 Ibrahim Drešević – Heerenveen – 2018–22
 Erton Fejzullahu – NEC – 2009–12
Arianit Ferati – Fortuna Sittard – 2021–
 Arian Kastrati – Fortuna Sittard – 2020-22
 Shkodran Metaj – Groningen, RKC Waalwijk – 2007–11
 Aro Murić – Breda, Willem II – 2018–19, 2020–21
 Milot Rashica – Vitesse – 2015–18
 Lum Rexhepi – Go Ahead Eagles – 2016–17
 Meritan Shabani – VVV-Venlo – 2020–21
 Arber Zeneli – Heerenveen – 2015–19

Latvia
Ģirts Karlsons – De Graafschap – 2007–08
Roberts Uldriķis – SC Cambuur – 2021–

Liberia
Dulee Johnson – De Graafschap – 2011–12
Mark Pabai – PEC Zwolle – 2021–22
Dionysius Sebwe – Utrecht – 1997–98
Christopher Wreh – Den Bosch – 2000–01

Lithuania
Vytautas Andriuškevičius – Cambuur – 2014–16
Ernestas Šetkus – ADO Den Haag – 2016–17
Andrius Skerla – PSV – 1997–2000

Luxembourg
Laurent Jans – Sparta Rotterdam – 2021–22
Aurélien Joachim – Willem II, RKC Waalwijk – 2012–14
Antoine Kohn – Fortuna '54, SC Enschede, Twente – 1959–68
Jean Noel – ADO Den Haag – 1976–77
Mica Pinto – Fortuna Sittard, Sparta Rotterdam – 2018–

Madagascar
Rémy Vita – Fortuna Sittard – 2022–

Mali
Bakary Diakité – De Graafschap – 2000–02
Nouha Dicko – Vitesse – 2019–20
Mahamadou Diarra – Vitesse – 1999–2002

Mexico
Edson Álvarez – Ajax – 2019–
Uriel Antuna – Groningen – 2017–19
Jesús Corona – Twente – 2013–15
Ulises Dávila – Vitesse – 2011–12
Santiago Giménez – Feyenoord – 2022–
Andrés Guardado – PSV – 2014–17
Érick Gutiérrez – PSV – 2018–
Hirving Lozano – PSV – 2017–20
Héctor Moreno – AZ, PSV –  2007–11, 2015–17
Joaquin del Olmo – Vitesse – 1996–97
Francisco Javier Rodríguez – PSV – 2008–11
Carlos Salcido – PSV – 2006–10
Jorge Sánchez – Ajax – 2022–

Moldova
Denis Calincov – Heerenveen, Heracles – 2004–06
Serghei Cleșcenco – Go Ahead Eagles – 1996–97
Vitalie Damașcan – Fortuna Sittard, RKC Waalwijk – 2018–21
Alexei Koșelev – Fortuna Sittard – 2018–21
Serghei Nani – Go Ahead Eagles – 1995–97

Montenegro
Aleksandar Boljević – PSV – 2014–15
Miodrag Božović – RKC Waalwijk – 1997–98
Luka Đorđević – Twente – 2013–14
Igor Gluščević – Utrecht, Vitesse, Heracles – 2000–08
Dino Islamović – Groningen – 2014–15
Dragoslav Jevrić – Vitesse – 1999–2005
Ivica Kralj – PSV Eindhoven – 1999–2002
Bogdan Milić – ADO Den Haag – 2008–10
Željko Petrović – Den Bosch, RKC Waalwijk, PSV – 1992–98

Morocco
Yassine Abdellaoui – Willem II, NAC, NEC – 1992–2003
Zakaria Aboukhlal – PSV, AZ – 2018–22
Rochdi Achenteh – PEC Zwolle, Vitesse, Willem II, Go Ahead Eagles – 2012–17
Alami Ahannach – MVV – 1997–99
Karim El Ahmadi – Twente, Feyenoord – 2003–12, 2014–18
Ismaïl Aissati – PSV, Twente, Ajax, Vitesse – 2005–12
Youssef El Akchaoui – ADO Den Haag, NEC, Heerenveen, VVV-Venlo, NAC – 2003–13
Taoufik Ameziane – Willem II – 1995–96
Lofti Amhaouch  – Sparta Rotterdam – 1995–96
Ahmed Ammi – Breda, ADO Den Haag, VVV-Venlo – 2007–13
Nordin Amrabat – VVV-Venlo, PSV – 2007–11
Sofyan Amrabat – Utrecht, Feyenoord – 2014–18
Oussama Assaidi – De Graafschap, Heerenveen, Twente – 2008–13, 2016–18
Yassin Ayoub – Utrecht, Feyenoord – 2012–20
Ayman Azhil – RKC Waalwijk – 2020–22
Naoufal Bannis – Feyenoord – 2021–22
Iliass Bel Hassani – Heracles Almelo, AZ, RKC Waalwijk – 2013–20, 2021–
Benaissa Benamar – Utrecht, Volendam – 2020–
Houssin Bezzai – Sparta Rotterdam – 1999–2002
Nourdin Boukhari – Sparta Rotterdam, Ajax, NAC, AZ, RKC Waalwijk – 2000–08, 2011–13
Ali Boussaboun – Groningen, NAC, Feyenoord, Utrecht, ADO Den Haag – 2001–07, 2008–09, 2010–12
Ouasim Bouy – PEC Zwolle – 2015–17, 2018–19
Manuel da Costa – PSV Eindhoven – 2006–08
Anouar Diba – Breda, Twente – 2000–07, 2009–10
Aziz Doufikar – PEC Zwolle, Fortuna Sittard – 1984–87, 1990–92
Ali Elkhattabi – Sparta Rotterdam, Heerenveen, AZ, RBC Roosendaal – 1995–06
Zakaria El Azzouzi – Twente, Sparta Rotterdam, Excelsior – 2015–18
Faouzi El Brazi – Twente – 2001–03
Abdelkrim El Hadrioui – AZ – 1998–2002
Mounir El Hamdaoui – Excelsior, Willem II, AZ, Ajax, AZ, Twente – 2002–03, 2006–11, 2015–16, 2017–19
Mohamed El Hankouri – Feyenoord, Willem II, Groningen – 2016–22
Redouan El Hankouri – Excelsior – 2018–19
Soufian El Hassnaoui – De Graafschap – 2013–14
Faysal El Idrissi – Groningen – 2000–02
Youssef El Kachati – Sparta Rotterdam – 2019–20
Souffian El Karouani – NEC – 2021–
Ibrahim El Kadiri – Volendam – 2022–
Issam El Maach –RKC Waalwijk, Twente – 2021–
Ahmed El Messaoudi – Fortuna Sittard, Groningen – 2018–21
Karim Fachtali – NEC, RKC Waalwijk – 2006–08, 2011–12
Adam Farouk – RBC Roosendaal – 2004–05
Youssef Fertout – AZ – 1998–2001
Abdou Harroui – Sparta Rotterdam – 2017–18, 2019–22
Oussama Idrissi – Groningen, AZ, Ajax – 2015–21
Anouar Kali – Utrecht, Roda JC, Willem II, Utrecht, Breda – 2010–19
Abdelkarim Kissi – Heerenveen – 2005–06
Zakaria Labyad – PSV, Vitesse, Utrecht, Ajax – 2009–12, 2013–15, 2016–22
Mimoun Mahi – Groningen, Utrecht – 2014–19, 2020–
Youssef Mariana – Willem II – 2000–04
Hachim Mastour – PEC Zwolle – 2016–17
Noussair Mazraoui – Ajax – 2017–22
Ali Messaoud – AZ, Willem II, NEC, Excelsior – 2012–13, 2014–15, 2016–19
Mourad Mghizrat – Sparta Rotterdam, Utrecht, Den Bosch, Willem II – 1996–2000, 2001–05
Youness Mokhtar – PEC Zwolle, Twente, ADO Den Haag – 2012–15, 2016–18, 2020–21
Imad Najah – RKC Waalwijk – 2012–14
Anas Ouahim – Heracles Almelo – 2021–22
Houssein Ouhsaine Ouichou – FC Volendam – 2003–04
Bilal Ould-Chikh – Feyenoord, Utrecht, ADO Den Haag – 2013–15, 2017–18, 2019–21
Yassin Oukili – Vitesse, RKC Waalwijk – 2019–20, 2021–
Adil Ramzi – Willem II, PSV, Twente, AZ, Utrecht, Roda JC – 1997–2007, 2011–13
Youssef Rossi – NEC – 1999–2000
Akram Roumani – RBC Roosendaal – 2005–06
Dries Saddiki – Willem II – 2018–22
Ismael Saibari – PSV – 2020–
Tarik Sektioui – Willem II, AZ – 2000–06
Khalid Sinouh – Heerenveen, RKC Waalwijk, AZ, Utrecht, PSV, NEC – 1997–98, 2000–05, 2006–07, 2009–13
Anas Tahiri – RKC Waalwijk, SC Heerenveen  – 2019–
Mohammed Tahiri – Sparta Rotterdam – 2022–
Oussama Tannane – Heerenveen, Heracles, Utrecht, Vitesse, NEC – 2012–16, 2018–
Adnane Tighadouini – Vitesse, NAC, Twente – 2010–12, 2013–15, 2016–18
Tarik Tissoudali – VVV-Venlo – 2017–18
Chakib Zbayri – RKC Waalwijk – 2003–04
Hakim Ziyech – Heerenveen, Twente, Ajax – 2012–20

New Zealand
Alan Johnstone – Utrecht – 1989–90
Fred de Jong – Fortuna Sittard – 1990–93
James McGarry – Willem II – 2018–20
Marco Rojas – Heerenveen – 2017–19 
Ryan Thomas – PEC Zwolle, PSV – 2013–18, 2019–22
Ivan Vicelich – Roda JC, RKC Waalwijk – 2000–07
Michael Woud – Willem II – 2018–20

Nigeria
Dele Adeleye – Sparta Rotterdam – 2006–10
Alloysius Agu – MVV – 1990–92
Abdul Jeleel Ajagun – Roda JC – 2016–17
Ajah Ogechukwu – Roda JC – 1990–95
Oluwafemi Ajilore – Groningen – 2008–11, 2012–13
Hamdi Akujobi – Heerenveen – 2019–22
Taiwo Awoniyi – NEC – 2016–17
Haruna Babangida – Vitesse – 2010–11
Ibrahim Babangida – FC Volendam – 1997–98
Tijani Babangida – VVV-Venlo, Roda JC, Ajax, Vitesse – 1991–92, 1993–2000, 2001–02
Abubakar Balarabe – MVV – 1994–95
Calvin Bassey – Ajax – 2022–
Charles Chiemezie – RKC Waalwijk – 1997–99
Abiola Dauda – Vitesse – 2014–17
Cyriel Dessers – Utrecht, Heracles, Feyenoord – 2017–20, 2021–22
Emmanuel Ebiede – Heerenveen – 1997–99
Tyronne Ebuehi – ADO Den Haag, Twente – 2014–18, 2020–21
Kingsley Ehizibue – PEC Zwolle – 2014–19
Chidera Ejuke – Heerenveen – 2019–20
Alex Emenike – VVV-Venlo – 2009–12
Fred Friday – AZ, Sparta Rotterdam – 2016–18
Finidi George – Ajax – 1993–96
Hilary Gong – Vitesse – 2018–22
Pius Ikedia – Ajax, Groningen, RBC Roosendaal, AZ, RKC Waalwijk – 1997–2007
Benedict Iroha – Vitesse – 1992–96
Sani Kaita – Sparta Rotterdam – 2005–08
Christopher Kanu – Ajax – 1999–2001
Nwankwo Kanu – Ajax – 1993–2006
Garba Lawal – Roda JC – 1996–2002
Ahmed Musa – VVV-Venlo – 2010–12
Kelechi Nwakali – VVV-Venlo – 2017–18
Emmanuel Nwakire – Utrecht, RKC Waalwijk – 1997–2003
Godfrey Nwankpa – Heerenveen – 1998–2001
Chidi Nwanu – RKC Waalwijk – 1996–98
Uche Nwofor – VVV-Venlo, Heerenveen – 2011–14
Kingsley Obiekwu – Go Ahead Eagles – 1995–98
Mike Obiku – Feyenoord, AZ – 1992–96, 1998–99
Bartholomew Ogbeche – Cambuur, Willem II – 2013–18
Maduka Okoye – Sparta Rotterdam – 2020–22
Michael Olaitan – Twente – 2015–16
Azubuike Oliseh – Utrecht, RBC Roosendaal – 1999–2005
Sunday Oliseh – Ajax – 1997–99
Kenneth Omeruo – ADO Den Haag – 2011–13
Henry Onwuzuruike – Heerenveen – 1997–99
John Owoeri – Feyenoord – 2005–06
Peter Rufai – Go Ahead Eagles – 1993–94
Wasiu Taiwo – De Graafschap, MVV – 1996–2000
Ode Thompson – RBC Roosendaal – 2003–04
William Troost-Ekong – Groningen, FC Dordrecht – 2013–15
Michael Uchebo – VVV-Venlo – 2009–11
Robin Udegbe – VVV-Venlo – 2011–12
Albert Yobo – FC Zwolle – 2003–04

North Macedonia
Xhelil Abdulla – De Graafschap – 2011–12
Aleksandar Damčevski – NAC – 2014–15
Milko Đurovski – Groningen, Cambuur – 1990–94
Samir Fazli – Heerenveen – 2009–14
Nikola Gjorgjev – Twente – 2017–18
Gjorgji Hristov – NEC, PEC Zwolle – 2000–04
Mile Krstev – Heerenveen, Groningen – 1998–2005
Denis Mahmudov – PEC Zwolle – 2013–15
Goran Popov – Heerenveen – 2008–10
Dževdet Šainovski – NEC – 1997–99
Aleksandar Stankov – Roda JC – 2009–12
Hristijan Denkovski – Groningen – 2014–15

Northern Ireland
Johnny Crossan – Sparta Rotterdam – 1959–61
Phil Gray – Fortuna Sittard – 1996–97
Sammy Morgan – Sparta Rotterdam – 1978–79
James Quinn – Willem II – 2002–05

Norway
Sveinung Aarnseth – VVV-Venlo – 1957–58
Roger Albertsen – FC Den Haag, Feyenoord – 1975–81
Fredrik Aursnes – Feyenoord – 2021–23
Harald Berg – FC Den Haag – 1971–74
Daniel Berg Hestad – Heerenveen – 2003–05
André Bergdølmo – Ajax – 2000–03
Fredrik André Bjørkan – Feyenoord – 2022–
Torgeir Børven – Twente – 2013–17
Filip Delaveris – Vitesse – 2020–21
Oliver Valaker Edvardsen – Go Ahead Eagles – 2022–
Magnus Wolff Eikrem – Heerenveen – 2013–14
Omar Elabdellaoui – Feyenoord – 2012–13
Tarik Elyounoussi – Heerenveen – 2008–11
Runar Espejord – Heerenveen – 2019–20
Håkon Evjen – AZ – 2019–
Tor Fuglset – FC Den Haag – 1972–73
Christian Grindheim – Heerenveen – 2007–11
André Hanssen – Heerenveen – 2004–07
Markus Henriksen – AZ – 2012–17
Harry Hestad – FC Den Haag – 1970–72
Thomas Holm – Heerenveen – 1998–2002
Johan Hove – Groningen – 2022–
Abdisalam Ibrahim – NEC – 2011–12
Ruben Yttergård Jenssen – Groningen – 2016–18
Ulrik Yttergård Jenssen – Willem II – 2021–22
Bjørn Maars Johnsen – ADO Den Haag, AZ – 2017–19
Dennis Johnsen – Ajax, Heerenveen, PEC Zwolle – 2017–20
Pa Modou Kah – Roda JC – 2004–11
Daniel Karlsbakk – Heerenveen – 2022–
Joshua Kitolano – Sparta Rotterdam – 2022–
Mathias Kjølø – PSV – 2020–
Tobias Lauritsen – Sparta Rotterdam – 2022–
Isak Dybvik Määttä – Groningen – 2022–
Børre Meinseth – Heerenveen – 1996–98
Elias Hoff Melkersen – Sparta Rotterdam – 2022–
Fredrik Midtsjø – AZ – 2017–22
Erik Mykland – Utrecht – 1994–95
Nicolai Næss – Heerenveen – 2017–19
Erik Nevland – Groningen – 2004–08
Kenneth Nysæther – Fortuna Sittard – 1992–93
Martin Ødegaard – Heerenveen, Vitesse – 2016–19
Fredrik Oppegård – PSV – 2020–
Marcus Pedersen – Vitesse – 2010–12, 2013–14
Marcus Holmgren Pedersen – Feyenoord – 2021–
Vajebah Sakor – Willem II – 2016–17
Alfons Sampsted – Twente – 2022–
Martin Samuelsen – VVV-Venlo – 2018–19
Finn Seemann – DWS, Utrecht – 1968–73
Harmeet Singh – Feyenoord – 2012–13
Alexander Sørloth – Groningen – 2015–17
Tom Kåre Staurvik – Breda – 1996–97
Erik Stock – NEC – 1990–94
Jørgen Strand Larsen – Groningen – 2020–
Jonas Svensson – AZ – 2016–21
Hallvar Thoresen – Twente, PSV – 1976–88
Morten Thorsby – Heerenveen – 2014–19
Sondre Tronstad – Vitesse – 2019–
Aslak Fonn Witry – AZ – 2021–22
Rafik Zekhnini – Twente – 2019–20

Paraguay
Édgar Barreto – NEC – 2003–07, 2021–22
Roberto Junior Fernández – Utrecht – 2011–12
Celso Ortiz – AZ – 2009–15

Peru
Miguel Araujo – Emmen – 2019–
Jefferson Farfán – PSV – 2004–08
Didier La Torre – Emmen – 2020–21
Marcos López – Feyenoord – 2022–
Reimond Manco – PSV, Willem II – 2008–09
Fernando Pacheco – Emmen – 2022–
Sergio Peña – Emmen – 2019–21
Renato Tapia – Twente, Feyenoord, Willem II – 2014–20

Philippines
Paul Mulders – ADO Den Haag, Cambuur – 2011–12, 2013–14

Poland
Filip Bednarek – Utrecht, Heerenveen – 2015–16, 2019–20
Bartosz Białek – Vitesse – 2022–
Paweł Bochniewicz – Heerenveen – 2020–
Krzysztof Bociek – FC Volendam, AZ, NEC, Den Bosch – 1995–2000
Henryk Bolesta – Feyenoord, Roda JC – 1989–93
Jerzy Dudek – Feyenoord – 1996–01
Andrzej Frankiewicz – NAC – 1968–71
Wojciech Golla – NEC – 2015–18
Tomasz Iwan – Roda JC, Feyenoord, PSV, RBC Roosendaal – 1994–2001
Jarosław Jach – Fortuna Sittard – 2020–21
Michał Janota – Feyenoord – 2008–10
Arkadiusz Kaliszan – Roda JC – 1993–94
Piotr Kasperski – Roda JC – 1995–97
Paweł Kieszek – Roda JC – 2011–12
Wisław Kitzmann – Breda – 1968–72
Aleksander Kłak – De Graafschap – 2003–05
Mateusz Klich – PEC Zwolle, Twente, Utrecht – 2012–14, 2016–18
Janusz Kowalik – Sparta Rotterdam, NEC, MVV – 1969–74, 1975–76, 1978–79
Kacper Kozłowski – Vitesse – 2022–
Mariusz Kukiełka – Roda JC – 1997–98
Filip Kurto – Roda JC, Dordrecht, Excelsior – 2012–16
Mikołaj Lebedyński – Roda JC – 2011–13
Jan Liberda – AZ – 1969–71
Zbigniew Małkowski – Excelsior, Feyenoord – 2002–03, 2004–05
Aleksander Mandziara – Breda – 1971–72
Radosław Matusiak – Heerenveen – 2007–08
Arkadiusz Milik – Ajax – 2014–16
Piotr Modrzejewski – HFC Haarlem – 1986–87
Jerzy Musiałek – Breda – 1972–73
Andrzej Niedzielan – Nijmegen – 2003–07
Karol Niemczycki – Breda – 2017–19
Bartek Pacuszka – Heracles – 2008–09
Piotr Parzyszek – De Graafschap – 2015–16
Norbert Pogrzeba – Breda – 1968–72
Mateusz Prus – Roda JC – 2010–13
Arkadiusz Radomski – Heerenveen, NEC – 1997–2005, 2008–10
Andrzej Rudy – Ajax – 1997–98
Tomasz Rząsa – De Graafschap, Feyenoord, Heerenveen, ADO Den Haag – 1997–2003, 2004–06
Jerzy Sadek – Sparta Rotterdam, Haarlem – 1972–75
Marek Saganowski – Feyenoord – 1996–97
Joachim Siwek – Breda – 1979–80
Euzebiusz Smolarek – Feyenoord, ADO Den Haag – 2000–02, 2003–05, 2011–12
Włodzimierz Smolarek – Feyenoord, Utrecht – 1988–96
Sebastian Steblecki – SC Cambuur – 2014–16
Stefan Szefer – MVV – 1969–71
Zygmund Szmidt – AZ – 1970–71
Sebastian Szymański – Feyenoord – 2022–
Przemysław Tytoń – Roda JC, PSV, Twente – 2007–08, 2009–14, 2022–
Jerzy Wilim – Telstar – 1972–73
Paweł Wojciechowski – Heerenveen, Willem II – 2008–11
Oskar Zawada – Twente – 2015–16

Portugal
Asumah Abubakar – Willem II – 2015–17
Mauro Almeida – FC Zwolle – 2003–04
Bruno Basto – Feyenoord – 2004–05
Bruma – PSV – 2019–
Joel Castro Pereira – RKC Waalwijk – 2021–
Jorge Chula – VVV-Venlo – 2010–11
Francisco Conceição – Ajax – 2022–
Dani – Ajax – 1996–2000
Eduardo – Vitesse – 2018–19
Wilson Eduardo – ADO Den Haag – 2014–15
Úmaro Embaló – Fortuna Sittard – 2022–
Walter Ferreira – FC Volendam – 1971–72
Ferro – Vitesse – 2022–
Edgar Marcelino – RBC Roosendaal – 2005–06
Pedro Marques – NEC – 2022–
Rui Mendes – Emmen – 2022–
David Nascimento – RKC Waalwijk, Roda JC, Utrecht, RKC Waalwijk, RBC Roosendaal – 1991–2003
Danilo Pereira – Roda JC – 2012–13
Josué – VVV-Venlo – 2010–11
Ivo Pinto – Fortuna Sittard – 2021–
Edson Silva – PSV, ADO Den Haag – 2003–05
Fábio Silva – PSV – 2022–
Ricardo Sousa – De Graafschap – 2004–05
João Carlos Teixeira – Feyenoord – 2020–22
Bruno Varela – Ajax – 2019–20
Bernardo Vasconcelos – RKC Waalwijk – 2003–05
Diogo Viana – VVV-Venlo – 2009–11
André Vidigal – Fortuna Sittard – 2018–19
João Virgínia – SC Cambuur – 2022–
Abel Xavier – PSV – 1997–98

Romania
Tudor Băluță – ADO Den Haag – 2019–20
Alin Bănceu – Fortuna Sittard – 1997–99
Andreas Calcan – Willem II – 2016–18
Rodion Cămătaru – Heerenveen – 1990–91
Cristian Chivu – Ajax – 1999–2003
Florin Constantinovici – Heerenveen – 1997–99
Marian Damaschin – Feyenoord – 1991–92
Mugur Gușatu – Heerenveen – 1997–99
Lucian Ilie – Groningen – 1992–93
Bogdan Lobonț – Ajax – 2000–05
Răzvan Marin – Ajax – 2019–20
Cosmin Mariș – Fortuna Sittard – 1997–98, 1999–2001
Nicolae Mitea – Ajax – 2003–07
Dumitru Mitriță – Heerenveen – 1997–2000
Ștefan Nanu – Vitesse – 1999–2002
Mihai Neșu – Utrecht – 2008–11
George Ogăraru – Ajax – 2006–08
Gheorghe Popescu – PSV – 1990–94
Andrei Rațiu – ADO Den Haag – 2020–21
Mihai Roman – NEC – 2015–16
Dorin Rotariu – AZ – 2018–19
Ioan Sabău – Feyenoord – 1990–92
Lucian Sânmărtean – Utrecht – 2006–09
Ovidiu Stîngă – PSV – 1996–2001
Cătălin Țîră – ADO Den Haag – 2013–14
Dorel Zegrean – Fortuna Sittard – 1997–2000

Russia
Ari – AZ – 2007–10
Ansar Ayupov – Twente – 1998–99
Dmitri Bulykin – ADO Den Haag, Ajax, Twente – 2010–13
Andrei Demchenko – Ajax – 1997–98
Anatoli Gerk – Twente – 2006–07
Vyacheslav Karavayev – Vitesse – 2017–20
Dmitri Khokhlov – PSV – 1997–2000
Denis Klyuyev – Feyenoord – 1994–96
Erik Korchagin – MVV – 1998–2000
Igor Korneev – Heerenveen, Feyenoord, NAC – 1995–2003
Arshak Koryan – Vitesse – 2016–17
Sergei Krutov – Vitesse – 1991–92
Valeri Masalitin – Vitesse – 1989–90
Yuriy Nikiforov – PSV, RKC Waalwijk – 1998–2003
Yuri Petrov – RKC Waalwijk, Twente – 1994–2003
Valeri Popovitch – Heerenveen – 1999–2000
Dmitri Shoukov – Vitesse, NAC, Willem II, Twente – 1995–2007
Fyodor Smolov – Feyenoord – 2010–11
Sergei Temryukov – PSV – 1997–98

Rwanda
Fritz Emeran – Fortuna Sittard – 2000–02

Saudi Arabia
Fahad Al-Ghesheyan – AZ – 1998–99
Mukhtar Ali – Vitesse – 2016–19

Scotland
Kenny Anderson – RKC Waalwijk – 2012–14
David Bielkus – SC Telstar – 1966–68
Scott Booth – Utrecht, Vitesse, Twente – 1998–2003
Jimmy Calderwood – Sparta Rotterdam, Willem II, Roda JC – 1979–87
Scott Calderwood – Willem II – 1996–97
John Clayton – Fortuna Sittard, FC Volendam – 1988–92
Colin Cramb – Fortuna Sittard – 2001–03
Ally Dick – Ajax – 1986–88
Darren Ferguson – Sparta Rotterdam – 1999
Robert Gray – MVV – 1972–75
Mel Holden – PEC Zwolle – 1978–79
Joe Jakub – AZ – 1986–88
George Johnston – Feyenoord – 2020-21
Paul Kerlin – De Graafschap, Go Ahead Eagles – 1976–79
Andy MacLeod – Fortuna Sittard – 1990–91
Rob McKinnon – Twente – 1996–98
Dennis Milne – Heracles – 1965–66
Frank Ross – Go Ahead Eagles – 2021–22
Jamie Smith – ADO Den Haag – 2004–05
Phil Tinney – Heracles – 1965–66

Senegal
Aliou Balde – Feyenoord – 2020–
Amadou Ciss – Fortuna Sittard – 2018–20
Noah Fadiga – Heracles Almelo – 2020–22
Lamine Sané – Utrecht – 2019–20
Mickaël Tavares – RKC Waalwijk – 2013–14
Ibrahima Touré – FC Dordrecht – 2014–15

Serbia
Luka Adžić – Emmen, PEC Zwolle – 2019–22
Nikolas Agrafiotis – Excelsior – 2022–
Stefan Babović – Feyenoord – 2009–10
Nenad Bjeković – Fortuna Sittard – 2000–01
Aleksandar Bjelica – Utrecht, PEC Zwolle, ADO Den Haag – 2013–15, 2019–20
Rade Bogdanović – Breda – 1997–98
Rajko Brežančić – AZ – 2015–16
Goran Bunjevčević – ADO Den Haag – 2006–07
Dejan Čurović – Vitesse, Groningen – 1994–2003
Uroš Đurđević – Vitesse – 2013–15
Igor Đurić – Heerenveen – 2009–11
Filip Đuričić – Heerenveen – 2009–13
Dejan Govedarica – Volendam, RKC Waalwijk, NEC – 1995–2004
Nenad Grozdić – Vitesse – 1999–2000
Spira Grujić – Twente, ADO Den Haag – 1998–2006
Nemanja Gudelj – NAC, AZ, Ajax – 2010–17
Aleksandar Ilić – Vitesse – 2003–04
Luka Ilić – NAC, Twente – 2018–19, 2020–21
Mateja Kežman – PSV – 2000–04
Filip Kostić – Groningen – 2012–14
Vladan Kujović – Roda JC, Willem II – 2002–07, 2010–11
Danko Lazović – Feyenoord, Vitesse, PSV – 2003–05, 2006–10
Goran Lovre – Groningen – 2006–10
Nemanja Matić – Vitesse – 2010–11
Uroš Matić – NAC – 2013–15
Dejan Meleg – Cambuur – 2014–15
Nemanja Mihajlović – Heerenveen – 2017–19
Mitar Mrkela – Twente, Cambuur – 1990–92, 1993–94
Srđan Obradović – Utrecht – 1996–98
Marko Pantelić – Ajax – 2009–10
Danilo Pantić – Vitesse, Excelsior – 2015–17
Marko Perović – Vitesse – 1997–98
Slobodan Rajković – PSV, Twente, Vitesse – 2007–11
Aleksandar Ranković – Vitesse, ADO Den Haag – 2002–07, 2008–10
Radoslav Samardžić – FC Volendam, Heerenveen, Feyenoord, RKC Waalwijk – 1995–2001, 2002–03
Uroš Spajić – Feyenoord – 2020–21
Nenad Srećković – De Graafschap – 2011–12
Filip Stanković – Volendam – 2022–
Dejan Stefanović – Vitesse – 2000–03
Filip Stevanović – Heerenveen – 2021–22
Vladimir Stojković – Vitesse – 2006–07
Miralem Sulejmani – Heerenveen, Ajax – 2007–13
Dušan Tadić – Groningen, Twente, Ajax – 2010–14, 2018–
Slobodan Tedić – PEC Zwolle – 2020–22
Ivica Vukov – FC Volendam – 1993–98
Jagoš Vuković – PSV, Roda JC – 2009–12
Zoran Zoran – Den Bosch – 1992–93
Miloš Zukanović – Breda – 2014–15

Sierra Leone
Sullay Kaikai – NAC – 2018–19
Issa Kallon – Utrecht, Cambuur – 2014–16, 2021–22
Ibrahim Kargbo – Willem II – 2006–10
Paul Kpaka – RBC Roosendaal – 2005–06
Gibril Sankoh – Groningen, Roda JC – 2004–10, 2015–16

Singapore
Fandi Ahmad – Groningen – 1983–85

Slovakia
Matúš Bero – Vitesse – 2018–
Róbert Boženík – Feyenoord – 2019–
Igor Demo – PSV – 1997–98
Stanislav Griga – Feyenoord – 1990–92
Dávid Hancko – Feyenoord – 2022–
Csaba Horváth – ADO Den Haag – 2008–10
František Kubík – ADO Den Haag – 2010–11
Milan Lalkovič – ADO Den Haag – 2011–12
Filip Lukšík – ADO Den Haag – 2011–13
Rastislav Mores – Roda JC, Nijmegen – 1995–98
Ivan Mráz – MVV – 1969–72
Adam Nemec – Willem II – 2015–16
Branislav Niňaj – Fortuna Sittard – 2018–21
Andrej Rendla – Twente, Heracles – 2007–12
Albert Rusnák – Cambuur, Groningen – 2014–17
Samuel Štefánik – NEC – 2013–14
Miroslav Stoch – Twente – 2009–10
Tomáš Suslov – Groningen – 2019–
Marián Zeman – Vitesse – 1997–2003

Slovenia
Denis Halilović – Willem II – 2010–11
Dragan Jelić – Willem II – 2010–11
Andraž Kirm – Groningen – 2012–14
Tim Matavž – Groningen, PSV, Vitesse – 2007–14, 2017–20
Martin Milec – Roda JC – 2015–17
Mitja Mörec – ADO Den Haag – 2011–12
Aleksandar Radosavljević – ADO Den Haag, VVV – 2010–13
Aleksander Šeliga – Sparta Rotterdam – 2009–10
Dalibor Stevanovič – Vitesse – 2008–11
Dejan Trajkovski – Twente – 2016–18
Etien Velikonja – Willem II – 2017–18
Dalibor Volaš – Sparta Rotterdam – 2017–18
Haris Vučkić – Twente – 2017–18
Luka Zahović – Heerenveen – 2015–16

South Africa
Staton Lewis Ajax – 2007–09
Gabriel 'Ninja' Mofokeng Ajax 
Kermit Erasmus – Feyenoord – 2008–09
Benni McCarthy – Ajax – 1997–99
Aaron Mokoena – Ajax – 1999–2000
Kamohelo Mokotjo – Feyenoord, PEC Zwolle, Twente – 2010–17
Bernard Parker – Twente – 2009–11
Steven Pienaar – Ajax – 2001–06
Neill Roberts – FC Amsterdam – 1976–77
Glen Salmon – Breda , Groningen, Breda – 2000–07
Thulani Serero – Ajax, Vitesse – 2011–19
Hans Vonk – RKC Waalwijk, Den Bosch, Heerenveen, Ajax – 1988–90, 1992–2006, 2008–09
Geoff Wegerle – Feyenoord – 1975–76
Steve Wegerle – Feyenoord – 1975–76

South Korea
Huh Jung-moo – PSV – 1980–83
Kim Nam-il – Excelsior – 2002–03
Lee Chun-soo – Feyenoord – 2007–08
Lee Young-pyo – PSV – 2003–05
Noh Jung-yoon – NAC – 1997–99
Park Ji-sung – PSV – 2003–05, 2013–14
Song Chong-gug – Feyenoord – 2002–05
Suk Hyun-jun – Ajax, Groningen – 2009–10, 2011–13

Spain
Pedro Alemañ – Sparta Rotterdam – 2022–
Angeliño – Breda, PSV – 2017–19
Bojan – Ajax – 2013–14
Oriol Busquets – Twente – 2019–20
Iván Calero – Sparta Rotterdam – 2016–17
Aitor Cantalapiedra – Twente – 2019–20
Álex Carbonell – Fortuna Sittard – 2019–20
Marc Cardona – Go Ahead Eagles – 2021–22
José María Cela – RKC Waalwijk – 1997–99
Pedro Chirivella – Go Ahead Eagles – 2016–18
Iñigo Córdoba – Go Ahead Eagles – 2021–
Isaac Cuenca – Ajax – 2012–13
Adrián Dalmau – Heracles, Utrecht, Sparta Rotterdam – 2018–22
Javier Espinosa – Twente – 2019–20
Paolo Fernandes – Breda – 2017–19
Dani Fernández – NEC, Feyenoord – 2007–10, 2011–12
José Fontán – Go Ahead Eagles – 2022–
José Fortes Rodríguez – AZ, RBC Roosendaal – 1995–06
Gabri – Ajax – 2006–10
Manu García – Breda – 2017–18
Gonzalo – Heerenveen, Heracles, Groningen, VVV – 2006–11, 2015–16
Marcos Gullón – Roda JC – 2015–17
Juanfran – Ajax – 2005–06
Miguel Ángel Leal – Groningen – 2020–21
Pol Llonch – Willem II – 2018–
Julen Lobete – RKC Waalwijk – 2022–
Jordi López – Vitesse – 2010–11
Albert Luque – Ajax – 2007–08
Pablo Marí – Breda – 2017–18
Iván Márquez – NEC – 2021–
Matos – Twente – 2019–20
Ximo Navarro – Fortuna Sittard – 2022–
Pablo Niño – RBC Roosendaal – 2003–04
Julio Pleguezuelo – Twente – 2019–
Oleguer – Ajax – 2008–11
Pascu – ADO Den Haag – 2020–21
Fernando Quesada – Utrecht – 2013–14
Jesús Reglero – Utrecht – 1977–78
Martí Riverola – Vitesse – 2010–11
José Rodríguez – Fortuna Sittard – 2018–19
Roger – Ajax – 2006–07
Pedro Ruiz Delgado – NEC – 2021–
Alberto Saavedra – ADO Den Haag – 2003–07
Sergio Sánchez – ADO Den Haag – 2006–07
Manuel Sánchez Torres – Twente, Roda JC, NEC Nijmegen – 1978–85, 1987–91
Fran Sol – Willem II – 2016–19
Ismael Urzaiz – Ajax – 2007–08
Enric Vallès – Breda – 2008–10
José María Vidal – Sparta Rotterdam – 1966–67

Suriname
Myenty Abena – De Graafschap – 2018–19
Roland Alberg – Excelsior, ADO Den Haag – 2011–12, 2013–16
Djavan Anderson – AZ, Cambuur, PEC Zwolle – 2014–16, 2021–22
Sheraldo Becker – PEC Zwolle, ADO Den Haag – 2014–19
Diego Biseswar – Feyenoord, Heracles, De Graafschap – 2005–12
Tjaronn Chery – Twente, SC Cambuur, Emmen, ADO Den Haag, Groningen – 2008–15
Damil Dankerlui – Willem II, Groningen – 2017–
Ryan Donk – RKC Waalwijk , AZ – 2005–08
Mitchell Donald – Ajax, Willem II, Roda JC – 2007–08, 2009–10, 2011–14
Iwan Fränkel – Blauw-Wit – 1962–64
Ray Fränkel – Groningen – 2003–04
Siegfried Haltman – AZ – 1968–69
Warner Hahn – PEC Zwolle, Excelsior, Heerenveen, Go Ahead Eagles – 2014–15, 2016–20, 2021–22
Ridgeciano Haps – AZ, Feyenoord – 2013–22
Nigel Hasselbaink – Excelsior – 2015–17
Florian Jozefzoon – Ajax, NAC Breda, RKC Waalwijk, PSV – 2010–17, 2022-
Sean Klaiber – FC Utrecht, Dordrecht, Ajax – 2013–
Leo Kogeldans – VVV-Venlo – 1957–59
Michel Kruin – USV Elinkwijk, DOS – 1956–64
Kelvin Leerdam – Feyenoord, Vitesse – 2008–17
Ramon Leeuwin – Utrecht, ADO Den Haag, Cambuur, AZ – 2007–08, 2010–21
Dion Malone – ADO Den Haag – 2012–17, 2018–19, 2020–21
Charley Marbach – USV Elinkwijk – 1956–61
Frank Mijnals – USV Elinkwijk, DOS – 1957–64
Miquel Nelom – Excelsior, Feyenoord, Sparta Rotterdam, Willem II – 2010–18, 2019–22
Shaquille Pinas – ADO Den Haag – 2017–21
Dennis Purperhart – HFC Haarlem, RKC Waalwijk – 1988–91
Herman Rijkaard – Blauw-Wit – 1957–60
Armand Sahadewsing – DWS – 1967–68
Erwin Sparendam – USV Elinkwijk, Blauw-Wit – 1956–58, 1959–64
Ryan Koolwijk – Excelsior, NEC, Dordrecht, PEC Zwolle – 2007–08, 2010–15, 2016–19, 2021–22
Roscello Vlijter – SC Telstar – 2019–20
Mitchell te Vrede – Excelsior, Feyenoord, Heerenveen, NAC Breda – 2011–16, 2017–19

Sweden
Paulos Abraham – Groningen – 2020–
Amin Affane – Roda JC – 2012–13
Rami Al Hajj – SC Heerenveen – 2020-
Hussein Ali – Heerenveen – 2022–
Marcus Allbäck – Heerenveen – 2000–02
Pontus Almqvist – Utrecht – 2021–22
Petter Andersson – Groningen – 2008–12
Samuel Armenteros – Heracles, Feyenoord, Willem II – 2009–15, 2016–17
Joel Asoro – Groningen – 2019–20
Andreas Augustsson – Twente – 1996–97
Bo Augustsson – FC Den Haag – 1972–74
Denni Avdić – PEC Zwolle, AZ, Heracles – 2012–15
Nabil Bahoui – De Graafschap – 2018–19
Emir Bajrami – Twente – 2010–13
Kennedy Bakircioglu – Twente, Ajax – 2005–10
Abgar Barsom – Heerenveen – 2002–03
Rasmus Bengtsson – Twente – 2010–15
Marcus Berg – Groningen, PSV – 2007–09, 2010–11
Fredrik Berglund – Roda JC – 2001–04
Emil Bergström – Utrecht, Willem II – 2018–22
Valmir Berisha – SC Cambuur – 2015–16
Harry Bild – Feyenoord – 1965–67
Paweł Cibicki – ADO Den Haag – 2019–20
Kristopher Da Graca – VVV-Venlo – 2021-22
Peter Dahlqvist – PSV – 1974–77
Inge Danielsson – Ajax – 1967–69
Erik Edman – Heerenveen – 2001–04
Ralf Edström – PSV – 1973–77
Dan Ekner – PSV – 1958–60
Rasmus Elm – AZ – 2009–12
Viktor Elm – Heerenveen, AZ – 2008–15
Johan Elmander – Feyenoord, NAC – 2000–04
Mathias Florén – Groningen – 2001–06
Alexander Gerndt – Utrecht – 2011–13
Andreas Granqvist – Groningen – 2008–11
Gabriel Gudmundsson – Groningen – 2019–22
John Guidetti – Feyenoord – 2011–12
Simon Gustafson – Feyenoord, Roda JC, Utrecht – 2015–22
Philip Haglund – Heerenveen – 2009–11
Emil Hansson – Feyenoord, RKC Waalwijk, Fortuna Sittard – 2016–18, 2019–22
Pär Hansson – Feyenoord – 2016–17
Petter Hansson – Heerenveen – 2002–07
Oscar Hiljemark – PSV – 2012–15
Sebastian Holmén – Willem II – 2019–21
Glenn Hysén – PSV – 1983–85
Zlatan Ibrahimović – Ajax – 2001–04
Patrik Ingelsten – Heerenveen – 2008–10
Klas Ingesson – PSV – 1993–94
Daleho Irandust – Groningen – 2021–
Alexander Isak – Willem II – 2018–19
Andreas Isaksson – PSV – 2008–12
Erik Israelsson – PEC Zwolle – 2016–18
Alexander Jeremejeff – Twente – 2020–21
Emil Johansson – Groningen – 2011–13
Magnus Johansson – Groningen – 1998–2003
Mattias Johansson – AZ – 2011–17
Karl-Johan Johnsson – NEC – 2012–14
Rami Kaib – Heerenveen – 2020–
Yahya Kalley – Groningen – 2021–
Jesper Karlsson – AZ – 2020–
Ove Kindvall – Feyenoord – 1966–71
Bobby Kociski – MVV – 1999–2000
Mayckel Lahdo – AZ – 2022–
Andreas Landgren – Willem II – 2010–11
Henrik Larsson – Feyenoord – 1993–97
Jordan Larsson – NEC – 2016–17
Peter Larsson – Ajax – 1987–91
Sam Larsson – Heerenveen, Feyenoord – 2014–20
Isac Lidberg – Go Ahead Eagles – 2021–
Rasmus Lindgren – Ajax, Groningen – 2004–11,2012–16
Sam Lundholm – NEC – 2015–17
Ramon Pascal Lundqvist – PSV, Breda, Groningen – 2016–17, 2018–
Daniel Majstorović – Twente – 2004–05
Johan Mårtensson – Utrecht – 2011–14
Alex Mortensen – Groningen – 2021–
Lasse Nilsson – Heerenveen, Vitesse – 2004–07, 2008–11
Marcus Nilsson – Utrecht – 2011–13
Torbjörn Nilsson – PSV – 1976–78
Kristoffer Nordfeldt – Heerenveen – 2011–15
Björn Nordqvist – PSV – 1972–75
Jan Nordström – Groningen – 1971–74
Benjamin Nygren – Heerenveen – 2020–22
Elias Olsson – Groningen – 2021–22
Jonas Olsson – NEC – 2005–08
Simon Olsson – Heerenveen – 2022–
Alexander Östlund – Feyenoord – 2004–06
Mike Owusu – NEC – 2001–03
Kristoffer Peterson – Utrecht, Roda JC, Heracles – 2014–20
Stefan Pettersson – Ajax – 1988–94
Mathias Rosén – Groningen – 1995–98
Markus Rosenberg – Ajax – 2005–07
Tobias Sana – Ajax – 2012–14
Amin Sarr – Heerenveen – 2021–
Stefan Selaković – Heerenveen – 2001–04
Aimar Sher – Groningen – 2022–
Isak Ssewankambo – NAC – 2014–15
Fredrik Stenman – Groningen – 2007–11
Anders Svensson – PSV – 1959–63
Max Svensson – Willem II – 2021–
Muamer Tanković – AZ – 2014–17
Tesfaldet Tekie – Fortuna Sittard – 2019–
Simon Thern – Heerenveen – 2014–17
Simon Tibbling – Groningen, Emmen – 2014–17, 2020–21
Alex Timossi Andersson – Heerenveen – 2022–
Ola Toivonen – PSV – 2008–14
Sharbel Touma – Twente – 2005–07
Patrik Wålemark – Feyenoord – 2022-
Pontus Wernbloom – AZ – 2009–12

Switzerland
Anton Allemann – PSV – 1963–64
Martin Angha – Fortuna Sittard – 2019–22
Roy Gelmi – VVV-Venlo – 2019–21
Darije Kalezić – RKC Waalwijk, De Graafschap – 1995–2002, 2005–06
Stephan Keller – RKC Waalwijk, De Graafschap – 2005–09
Raymond Morand – Fortuna '54 – 1958–59
Yvon Mvogo – PSV – 2020–22
Blaise Nkufo – Twente – 2003–10
Jean-Pierre Rhyner – Emmen – 2020–21
Ricardo Rodríguez – PSV – 2019–20
Filip Ugrinic – Emmen – 2019–20
Johann Vogel – PSV – 1999–2005
Julian Von Moos – Vitesse – 2021–22
Johan Vonlanthen – PSV, NAC – 2003–06

Syria
Sanharib Malki – Roda JC – 2011–13
George Mourad – Willem II – 2007–10
Mohammed Osman – Vitesse, Heracles Almelo, Sparta Rotterdam – 2015–20, 2021–22

Thailand
Geoffrey Prommayon – PSV, Willem II – 1990–2001

Togo
Mawouna Amevor – Go Ahead Eagles – 2013–15
Frederic Ananou – Roda JC – 2016–18
Dermane Karim – Feyenoord – 2021–
Peniel Mlapa – VVV-Venlo – 2018–19
Massamasso Tchangai – De Graafschap – 1999–2001

Trinidad and Tobago
Darryl Roberts – Sparta Rotterdam – 2007–08
Levi García – AZ, Excelsior – 2015–2018

Tunisia
Hakim Braham – DS '79 – 1983–84
Rami Kaib – Heerenveen – 2020–
Omar Rekik – Sparta Rotterdam – 2022–
Karim Saidi – Feyenoord – 2004–07
Hatem Trabelsi – Ajax – 2001–06

Turkey
Mehmet Akgün – Willem II – 2007–10
Ali Akman – NEC – 2021–22
Mustafa Aksit – NAC – 1996–97
Ceylan Arikan – NAC – 1994–96
Yusuf Barası – AZ – 2021–
Bilal Başaçıkoğlu – Heerenveen, Feyenoord, Heracles Almelo – 2013–18, 2021–22
Ömer Bayram – NAC – 2009–12
Sinan Bakış – Heracles Almelo – 2020–22
Nadir Çiftçi – NAC – 2012–13
Aykut Demir – NAC, Excelsior – 2006–09
Halil Dervişoğlu – Sparta Rotterdam, Twente – 2019–21
Kenan Durmuşoğlu – AZ, Cambuur – 1996–2000
Doğan Erdoğan – Fortuna Sittard – 2022–
Tarik Evre – PEC Zwolle – 2015–16
Kerim Frei – Emmen – 2019–21
Metehan Güçlü – FC Emmen – 2022–
Adnan Gülek – Sparta Rotterdam – 1983–84
Doğucan Haspolat – Excelsior – 2016–19
Melih İbrahimoğlu – Heracles Almelo – 2020–22
Uğur İnceman – Roda JC – 2015–16
Ferdi Kadıoğlu – NEC Nijmegen – 2016–18
Sinan Kaloğlu – Vitesse – 2009–10
Yasin Karaca – De Graafschap – 2002–03
Suvat Karadag – Utrecht – 1992–93
Colin Kazim-Richards – Feyenoord – 2014–16
Ahmet Keloğlu – ADO Den Haag – 1980–82
Orkun Kökçü – Feyenoord – 2018–
Evren Korkmaz – VVV-Venlo – 2017–19
Ahmed Kutucu – Heracles Almelo – 2020–21
Serdar Öztürk – Groningen – 2007–08
Oğuzhan Özyakup – Feyenoord, Fortuna Sittard – 2019–20, 2022-
Görkem Sağlam – Willem II – 2020-22
Nuri Şahin – Feyenoord – 2007–08
Fatih Sonkaya – Roda JC – 1998–2004
Tunahan Taşçı – Fortuna Sittard – 2022–
Ayhan Tumani – FC Volendam, NEC – 1996–99
Enes Ünal – Twente – 2016–17
Fuat Usta – Fortuna Sittard, Cambuur, Sparta Rotterdam – 1990–2000
Abdülhamit Yıldız – FC Volendam – 2008–09
Burak Yılmaz – Fortuna Sittard – 2022–
Cemal Yilmaz – PSV – 1987–89
Mustafa Yücedağ – Ajax, PEC Zwolle – 1985–88

Uganda
Melvyn Lorenzen – ADO Den Haag – 2017–19

Ukraine
Yevhen Levchenko – Vitesse, Cambuur, Groningen, Willem II – 1996–11
Denys Oliynyk – Vitesse – 2014–16
Serhiy Pohodin – Roda JC – 1993–94
Ruslan Valeyev – De Graafschap – 2000–05
Oleksandr Yakovenko – ADO Den Haag – 2014–15
Oleksandr Zinchenko – PSV – 2016–17

United States
Juan Agudelo – Utrecht – 2013–14
Jozy Altidore – AZ – 2011–13
Hamisi Amani-Dove – AZ – 1996–97
Cole Bassett – Feyenoord, Fortuna Sittard  – 2021–23
DaMarcus Beasley – PSV – 2004–06
Gregg Berhalter – Sparta Rotterdam, SC Cambuur – 1996–2000
Taylor Booth – Utrecht – 2022–
Michael Bradley – Heerenveen – 2006–08
Sergiño Dest – Ajax – 2019–21
Cory Gibbs – Feyenoord, ADO Den Haag – 2004–06
Aron Jóhannsson – AZ – 2012–15
David Johnson – Willem II – 2002–05
Charles Kazlauskas – NEC – 2004–05
Richard Ledezma – PSV – 2020–
Ulysses Llanez – Heerenveen – 2020–21
Djordje Mihailovic – AZ – 2022–
Lee Nguyen – PSV – 2005–06
Matt Miazga – Vitesse – 2016–18
John O'Brien – Utrecht, Ajax, ADO Den Haag – 1998–2006
Shane O'Neill – Excelsior – 2017–18
Oguchi Onyewu – Twente – 2010–11
Andrija Novakovich – Fortuna Sittard – 2018–19
Erik Palmer-Brown – Breda – 2018–19
Desevio Payne – Groningen, Excelsior, Emmen – 2014–18, 2019–21
Ricardo Pepi – Groningen – 2022–
Rubio Rubin – Utrecht – 2014–17
Alex Skotarek – MVV – 1971–72
Earnie Stewart – VVV, Willem II, NAC – 1988–89, 1990–96, 1997–99, 2000–03
Luca de la Torre – Heracles – 2020–22
Steve Trittschuh – SVV Dordrecht – 1992–93
Peter Vermes – FC Volendam – 1989–90
Haji Wright – VVV – 2019–20

Uruguay
Yuri Banhoffer – PEC Zwolle – 1978–79
Pepe Fernández – Go Ahead Eagles, HFC Haarlem – 1970–74
Matías Jones – Groningen – 2011–12
Nicolás Lodeiro – Ajax – 2009–10, 2011–12
Gastón Pereiro – PSV – 2015–20
Fernando Picun – Feyenoord – 1996–99
Sergio Rochet – AZ – 2014–17
Mario-Ernesto Rodríguez – Groningen – 1997–98
Bruno Silva – Groningen, Ajax – 2005–09
Luis Suárez – Groningen, Ajax – 2006–11
David Texeira – Groningen – 2011–14

Venezuela
Rubén Alejandro Ramírez – Fortuna Sittard – 2018–19
Roberto Rosales – Twente – 2010–14
Christian Santos – NEC – 2015–16

Wales
Jimmy Cardno – HFC Haarlem – 1973–74
Simon Church – Roda JC – 2016–17
Nick Deacy – PSV, Vitesse – 1975–78, 1979–80
Trevor Ford – PSV – 1957–60
Paul Giles – Excelsior, Dordrecht – 1983–84
Cian Harries – Fortuna Sittard – 2019–20
Barry Hughes – Blauw-Wit – 1961–63
George Thomas – ADO Den Haag – 2019–20

Yugoslavia
Petar Adjanski – FC Eindhoven, Willem II – 1975–77, 1980–82
Zvonko Bego – Twente – 1967–68
Nebojša Brajović – MVV – 1978–79
Božo Broketa – Ajax – 1958–59
Nikola Budišić – NAC – 1974–79
Nedeljko Bulatović – Twente, Sittardia, Fortuna Sittard – 1965–66, 1967–69
Boško Bursać – Vitesse – 1977–80
Ladislav Butković – MVV – 1958–59
Srđan Čebinac – Fortuna Sittard – 1966–68
Zvezdan Čebinac – PSV – 1966–67
Nenad Cerović – RKC Waalwijk – 1989–90
Vladimir Ćirić – SVV, Den Bosch – 1969–73
Dušan Ćosić – Willem II – 1979–80
Jovan Ćurčić – USV Elinkwijk – 1966–67
Pavle Dolezar – Go Ahead Eagles – 1971–72
Joško Gluić – Go Ahead Eagles, Ajax – 1974–77
Blagoje Istatov – Utrecht – 1976–78
Aleksandar Jončić – Xerxes/DHC'66 – 1966–68
Miodrag Jovanović – VVV – 1976–79
Pavle Kiš – PSV – 1968–69
Rajko Kovačević – Feyenoord – 1977–78
Stefan Kurčinac – VVV – 1975–81
Stjepan Matić – Sparta Rotterdam, Telstar – 1975–76, 1976–77
Ivan Matijasić – Telstar – 1966–67
Rizah Mešković – AZ – 1976–79
Đorđe Milić – Utrecht – 1968–69
Zoran Mišić – Twente – 1966–73
Blagoje Mitić – Willem II – 1966–67
Ilija Mitić – Den Bosch – 1971–73
Krsto Mitrović – Fortuna Sittard – 1982–83
Josip Mohorović – NAC – 1976–79
Fikret Mujkić – NAC – 1974–75
Husref Musemić – Twente – 1990–91
Milan Nikolić – PSV, Willem II – 1956–57, 1958–61
Blagoje Paunović – Utrecht – 1975–77
Dojčin Perazić – FC Den Haag – 1974–78
Aleksandar Petaković – Fortuna '54 – 1963–65
Ivan Pintarić – Breda – 1968–69
Dragan Popadić – Haarlem – 1974–75
Ivan Popović – Sittardia – 1966–67
Tomislav Prosen – NEC – 1971–72
Lazar Radović – Xerxes, PSV – 1966–72
Mladen Ramljak – Feyenoord – 1973–77
Jovan Rasić – AZ – 1968–69
Dragan Samardžić – Willem II – 1979–80 
Spasoje Samardžić – Twente, Feyenoord – 1966–69
Slobodan Savić – FC Eindhoven – 1976–77
Božidar Senčar – Breda – 1957–58
Josip Simoković – DWS – 1967–68
Edin Sprečo – NAC – 1975–76
Milan Stanić – Telstar – 1969–72
Miroslav Vardić – Breda – 1973–75 
Velibor Vasović – Ajax – 1966–71
Branislav Veljković – DOS – 1968–69
Branimir Vratnjan – Holland Sport – 1967–69
Mario Vusković – Go Ahead Eagles – 1975–79

Zambia
Kåre Becker – Twente – 1995–96
Kalusha Bwalya – PSV – 1989–94
Jacob Mulenga – Utrecht, Go Ahead Eagles – 2009–14, 2021–22

Zimbabwe
Marvelous Nakamba – Vitesse – 2014–17

Notes

References
FootballDatabase.eu
Soccerway.com

Eredivisie
 
Netherlands
Association football player non-biographical articles